= Anton Ernst Oldofredi =

German scholar and politician

Anton Ernst Oldofredi (1906-1982) was a German scholar and politician. In the early stage of the Second World War he served as the Volksführer of the German minority in Carpatho-Ukraine and held the post of Under-Secretary of State in the government of the short-lived Republic of Carpatho-Ukraine.

Born in Elbogen an der Eger on 13 March 1906 as Anton Ernst Fladerer. He took the name Oldofredi in 1936, having been legally adopted by the former Austrian count Léonce Graf von Oldofredi under Austrian law in that year. He obtained an engineering degree from the Technical University of Prague in 1929. Between 1931 and 1938 he worked with agricultural institutions in Slovakia and Moravia. In Slovakia he joined the Carpathian German Party around 1935. Initially he was active organizing the party in the German enclave in Kremnica-Nitrianske Pravno. Later the party leader Franz Karmasin sent him to Subcarpathian Rus' to lead the party branch there. Following the 1938 Munich Agreement, Oldofredi was named by Volksdeutsche Mittelstelle in Berlin as the Volksführer of the German People's Council of Carpatho-Ukraine.

In 1939 Oldofredi was elected to the Soim, the parliament of Carpatho-Ukraine. He represented the German minority on the unity list of the Ukrainian National Organization. As Carpatho-Ukraine declared its independence, Oldofredi was named Under-Secretary of State of the short-lived republic. He served as the head of the Deutscher Aufbaudienst in Slovakia during the Second World War, as well as serving in frontline cavalry.

In 1945 Oldofredi moved to French occupation zone in Germany. He settled down in Blieskastel, Saarland. In Saar he worked as an agronomist at the Agricultural School of Blieskastel and Merzig and as an economic advisor to the Saarland government. In 1953 he obtained a doctorate degree in agronomy at the University of Hohenheim. In 1954 the Ministry of Interior of Saarland declared the adoption of Oldofredi as void. In 1957 he obtained a dr. rer. oec. degree from the University of Innsbruck. Between 1964 and 1970 he served as regional chairman of the Federation of Agronomists. In 1971 he moved to Baden-Baden. He served as chairman of the Institute of Cultural Anthropology in Freiburg 1974–1976. In 1975 he obtained a Dr. rer. nat. degree from the University of Freiburg.

Oldofredi died in Offenburg on 15 March 1982.
