= German People's Group in Czecho-Slovakia =

The German People's Group in Czecho-Slovakia (German: Deutsche Volksgruppe in der Tschecho-Slowakei, abbreviated DVG) was a German minority political party in the Second Czechoslovak Republic.

== Formation ==
The Sudeten German Party (SdP) was banned by the Czechoslovak government on 15 September 1938, in the midst of the Sudeten crisis. In areas that had remained in Czechoslovakia after the German annexation of Sudetenland its followers re-grouped as DVG. The party had a National Socialist profile and represented German state interests towards Czechoslovakia.

In Slovakia, the movement had constituted itself as the German Party (Deutsche Partei) on October 8, 1938. DVG was launched on 30 October 1938. In Carpatho-Ukraine the movement worked under the name German People's Council (Deutsche Volksrat). Ernst Kundt was the leader of the party and in-charge (Volksgruppeführer) in Bohemia and Moravia, Franz Karmasin the leader of the German Party in Slovakia and Anton Ernst Oldofredi the leader of the German People's Council in Carpatho-Ukraine.

== Press ==
In Brno the party published Tagesboten, which was renamed as Volksdeutsche Zeitung in February 1939. Volksdeutsche Zeitung was published from Prague and Brno.

== National Assembly ==
After the annexation of Sudetenland, six of the SdP/KdP members of the Chamber of Deputies and four of its senators had remained in Czechoslovakia. One of them, deputy Gustav Peters, resigned from his seat on 5 November 1938. On 7 November 1938, the remaining five deputies formed the Club of German National Socialist Deputies as their new parliamentary faction. The club was chaired by Kundt. The four other members were Franz Karmasin, Robert Mayr-Harting, Hans Lokscha and Stanislav Králíček. On the same day the four senators formed the Club of German National Socialist Senators, chaired by Dr. Karl Hilgenreiner. The three other Senators were Kurt Brass, Sigmund Keil and Emil Schrammel.

== In Slovakia ==
On December 18, 1938 the German Party got two deputies elected to the parliament of Slovakia on the Slovak unity list; Karmasin and Josef Steinhübl. The party published Grenzbote and Deutschen Stimmen from Bratislava. The German Party in Slovakia would continue to exist after the end of the Second Czechoslovak Republic.

== In Carpatho-Ukraine ==
The German People's Council functioned as the National Socialist unity party amongst the German minority in the Carpatho-Ukraine 1938–1939. In the elections to the Soim (parliament of Carpatho-Ukraine) held on 12 February 1939, the party was able to get Oldofredi elected as its candidate on the unity list of Ukrainian National Union (UNO).
