= Soim =

The Soim (Ukrainian: Сойм Карпатської України, romanized: Soim Karpatskoi Ukrainy) was the parliament of the short-lived Republic of Carpatho-Ukraine. The assembly had its seat in Khust.

== Background ==
The establishment of a Soim, an autonomous parliament for the Ruthenian region, had been stipulated in the 11th article of the 1919 Treaty of Saint-Germain-en-Laye. But the establishment of the autonomous parliament was delayed for many years.

== Election ==
DVR flyer, calling to Germans of Carpathian Ukraine for support to the unity list

After years of delays, election to the Soim was held on 12 February 1939 on the basis of the passing of legislation by the Czechoslovak parliament providing further autonomy for Carpatho-Ukraine on 22 November 1938. 32 members of the Soim were elected from a single constituency. The Ukrainian National Union (UNO) presented a unity list for the vote. According to results published, 244,922 out of 265,002 votes cast (92%) went in favour of the unity list.

Out of the 32 members elected there were 29 Ukrainians, 1 Czech, 1 German and 1 Romanian. The German deputy was Anton Ernst Oldofredi, leader of the German People's Council (Deutsche VolksRat, DVR).

The elected candidates were:

	Name	Village	Office/Profession
1	Dr. Avgustyn Voloshyn	Khust	Premier of the Government of Carpatho-Ukraine
2	Yulian Revay	Khust	Minister of the Government of Carpatho-Ukraine
3	Dr. Mychailo Briaschayko	Khust	notary public
4	Dr. Julius Briaschayko	Khust	attorney
5	Ivan Gryga	Vyshni Verets'ky	farmer
6	Rev. Adalbert Dovbak	Izky	Priest
7	Dr. Mykola Dolynay	Khust	Hospital Director of the hospital, Khust
8	Dr. Milosh Drbal	Khust	attorney
9	Augustine Dutka	Khust	Judge
10	Ivan Ihnatko	Bilky	farmer
11	Dr. Volodymyr Komarynsky	Khust	Head of Press Department
12	Ivan Kachala	Perechyn	railroad engineer
13	Vasyl' Klempush	Yasinya	businessman, Yasinya
14	Stepan Klochurak	Khust	Secretary to the Prime Minister
15	Vasyl' Latsanych	Velykyy Bereznyy	teacher
16	Mykola Mandzyuk	Sevlyush	teacher
17	Mykhaylo Marushchak	Velykyy Bychkiv	farmer
18	Leonid Romanyuk	Khust	engineer
19	Rev. Grigorie Moysh	Bila Tserkov	priest
20	Dmytro Nimchuk	Khust	President of the Public Health Insurance Institution
21	Anton Ernst Oldofredi	Khust	Under Secretary of State
22	Yuriy Pazukhanych	Khust	school inspector
23	Ivan Perevuznyk	Serednye	farmer
24	Petro Popovych	Velyki Luchky	farmer
25	Fedir Revay	Khust	Director of the State Printing House
26	Dr. Mykola Risdorfer	Svalyava	physician
27	Dr. Stefan Roscha	Khust	Ministry of Education officia
28	Rev. Yuriy Stanynets'	Vonihovo	pastor
29	Vasyl' Shobey	Vul'khivtsi	farmer
30	Avhustyn Shtefan	Khust	Chief of the Ministry of Education and Religious Affairs
31	Rev. Fedelesh	Khust	Professor of Religion
32	Mykhaylo Tulyk	Khust	journalist

== Session ==
The Soim met once on 15 March 1939. The inaugural session had been scheduled for 2 March 1939 but the Czecho-Slovak president Emil Hácha opted not to convene the assembly. In response to the Slovak declaration of independence on 14 March 1939, the regional government of Avgustyn Voloshyn called for an independent Carpatho-Ukrainian state under the protection of the German Reich.

Whilst the session was in progress the time Hungarian troops were on the offensive in Carpatho-Ukraine and Czecho-Slovak forces were retreating westward. Augustin Stefan served as the speaker of the assembly. Stefan Roscha served as the vice speaker of the assembly.

The assembly, with 22 members present, declared the independence of the Republic of Carpatho-Ukraine. The session ratified the constitution of the Republic of Carpatho-Ukraine, with Ukrainian as the official language and a presidential form of governance. The Soim elected Voloshyn as President of the Republic. Yulian Revay was named Prime Minister.

Khust was attacked by Hungarian forces on the same day as the session was held. Carpatho-Ukraine was annexed by Hungary the following day, ending the brief existence of the Republic of Carpatho-Ukraine.

== Tragedy of Carpatho-Ukraine ==
The Soim session is depicted in the 1940 movie Tragedy of Carpatho-Ukraine, produced by Vasyl Avramenko.
