= Miloš Drbal =

Czech lawyer and politician

Miloš Drbal was a Czech lawyer and politician. Drbal held a Doctor of Laws (JUDr.) degree. He arrived in Subcarpathian Rus'/Transcarpathia in the early 1920s. Settling down in Khust, he served as the district government commissioner and as mayor of the town. He learnt to speak Hungarian language. As of the mid-1920s, Drbal was the deputy chairman of the Carpatho-Russian branch of the Czechoslovak National Council.

On 20 January 1939 Prime Minister of Carpatho-Ukraine Avgustyn Voloshyn received a delegation of the Czech National Council. During the meeting Voloshyn offered the Czech minority one seat on the list of the Ukrainian National Union (UNO) in the upcoming elections to the Soim (parliament of Carpatho-Ukraine). The Czech National Council Executive Committee held a meeting thereafter, and choose Drbal as their candidate. Drbal occupied the 8th slot on the UNO list. Drbal began his election campaign rather late, on 5 February 1939 (just one week before the vote). He held campaign meetings in Tiachiv and Solotvyno, and would go on to visit all district headquarters of Carpatho-Ukraine during the electoral campaign. As the Czech population in Carpatho-Ukraine were mainly state officials and other civil servants that had moved there after the creation of Czechoslovakia, Drbal's campaign was centered in the towns of the territory. After the election, he was included in the Commission on Culture and Education of the Soim.

In 1941 Drbal, now residing in Kroměříž, renounced his position as lawyer. In 1945 Soviet authorities deported him to Yenakievo camp, where he later died.
