= Josef Steinhübl =

Ethnic German priest and politician in Slovakia

- Born: 26 March 1902; Németpróna, Austria-Hungary
- Died: 18 April 1984 (aged 82); Stuttgart, West Germany
- Occupations: Catholic priest, politician

Josef Steinhübl (26 March 1902 – 18 April 1984) was a German politician and Catholic priest.

Steinhübl was born on 26 March 1902 in Németpróna, also known as Deutsch-Proben, in Hungary, Austria-Hungary (now Nitrianske Pravno, Slovakia). He lost his father at the age of three. He studied at Roman Catholic secondary school in Prievidza 1912–1918, and went on the study theology 1920–1921 at the University of Brno faculty in Olomouc and 1921–1925 in Prague. He did his military service 1923–1924.

Steinhübl was ordained in 1925. Until 1928 he served as pastor in Kremnické Bane (Hauerland), then in Sohler-Lipcse (Banská Bystrica) 1928–1932, in Münnichwies (Hauerland) 1932–1936 and from 1936 to 1940 in Handlová.

He joined the Carpathian German Party (KdP) and served as head of the party (Landschaftsleiter) in Hauerland between 1934 and 1938. When the KdP moved towards Nazism under Franz Karmasin, Steinhübl stood out as the sole KdP leader that publicly criticized the introduction of the Führer principle (albeit in vague terms).

Steinhübl and Karmasin were the two German Party deputies was elected to the Slovak Parliament (Landtag) on 18 December 1938 on the unity list of the Hlinka Slovak People's Party – Party of Slovak National Unity (HSĽS-SSNJ). He remained a member of the parliament of the Slovak Republic until 1945. On 1 October 1939 he was named inspector for German schools in the Roman Catholic Diocese of Banská Bystrica. On 15 May 1942, parliament approved Decree 68/1942 regulating the deportation of Jews. Steinhübl was among those who left the assembly hall on a protest before voting.

As the Red Army approached Handlová he escaped to the Bohemian town of Aš, which was controlled by U.S. troops. He was handed over to Czechoslovak authorities and held as a prisoner of war in Bratislava 1945–1948. Steinhübl was sentenced to death in a Bratislava people's tribunal on 18 March 1946. In 1948 his sentence was changed to life imprisonment. He was detained at a labour camp in Ústie nad Oravou 1948–1949 and then jailed at Leopoldov until July 1955. Upon release from prison, he was expelled to West Germany.

In West Germany he worked as pastor in Stuttgart between 1956 and 1969. In 1956 he founded an organization called Hilfsbund karpatendeutscher Katholiken ('Aid Committee for Carpathian German Catholics'), in competition with another association with the same name founded by pastor Jakob Bauer in 1948. Steinhübl died on 18 April 1984 in Stuttgart.
