= SS-Heimatschutz Slowakei =

SS-Heimatschutz Slowakei (HS) was an auxiliary military formation within the Waffen-SS in Slovakia during World War II.

== Background ==
From 1943, the agents of the Deutsche Partei of the Slovak Germans, sent news of partisan activities in Slovakia to Germany. In the summer of 1944, these reports were becoming more common and more specific about the activities of partisans in Eastern and Central Slovakia. On 25 July 1944, a meeting of Slovak German leaders was held in Bratislava. Here, Franz Karmasin called for the establishment of a paramilitary organization in the Slovak state. On 19 August 1944 Karmas sent a summary report to Heinrich Himmler in which he stated that the situation in Slovakia was becoming critical, not only because of frequent partisan activities but also because of the division and weakness of the Slovak forces. Karmasin also informed Himmler that the Germans in Slovakia had begun to set up the Heimatschutz (HS), an armed organization under the command of Ferdinand Klug, head of the Freiwillige Schutzstaffel (FS), with the agreement of the German Embassy.

=== Heimatschutz ===
The main task of Heimatschutz was to protect the German minority in Slovakia against possible partisan attacks, so they started arming their members. Karmasin's plan failed however because the Slovak national uprising exploded earlier than expected on 29 August 1944, and in some cases the weapons intended for arming the Heimatschutz members were seized by the partisans. At the beginning of September 1944, the training of members of the HS armed organization began, involving the 8,000 male Germans in Slovakia. At the time of the uprising, Heimatschutz units were under the command of SS-Obergruppenführer Gottlob Berger. Following the outbreak of the uprising, armed units of the HS were strengthened and in many cases committed crimes against the Slovak civilian population. There were campaigns against the partisans hiding in the mountains and in the forests. After the collapse of the Slovak national uprising, in November 1944, the Heimatschutz, together with SS units and the Hlinka Guard, embarked on a campaign of terror.

== Establishment and activities ==
In March 1945, the Heimatschutz armed forces were reorganized, and the SS-Heimatschutz "Slowakei" unit was set up under SS-Obersturmbannführer Hans Thumser. The commander of the SS-Heimatschutz "Slowakei" was Colonel Rudolf Pilfousek, formerly an officer of the Czechoslovak Army, who had later participated in the campaign against the Soviet Union as an officer of the Slovakian army and joined the SS in 1944 as SS-Standartenführer. Pilfousek was directly responsible to SS-Obergruppenführer Gottlob Berger. The operations of SS-Heimatschutz "Slowakei" were not long-lived, its combat activity was not significant, and its members had a low level of combat morale.

== Sources ==
- Kováč, Dušan: Nemecko a nemecká menšina na Slovensku, 1871–1945, Bratislava, Veda, 1991
- Kováč, Dušan: History of Slovakia, Bratislava, Kalligram, 2011
- Steinweis, Alan E. - Rogers, Daniel E .: The Impact of Nazism: New Perspectives on the Third Reich and Its Legacy, 2003
