= Ivan Rohach =

Ukrainian writer (1913–1942)

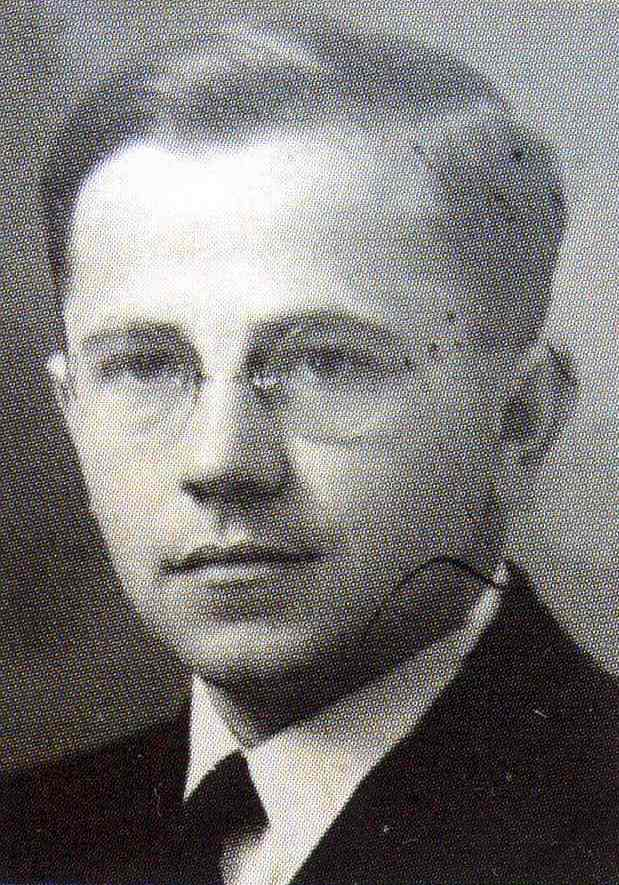
Ivan Rohach

Ivan Andriyovych Rohach (Ukrainian: Іван Андрійович Рогач; 29 May 1913 – 21 February 1942) was a Ukrainian journalist, poet, writer, and political activist.

== Biography ==
Rohach was born in Velykyi Bereznyi (Hungarian: Nagyberezna), Ung county, Austria-Hungary (modern-day Ukraine). From 1933 to 1938, he was the editor of the Novoyi Svobody newspaper in Uzhhorod, in Carpathian Ruthenia, then part of Czechoslovakia and today in western Ukraine. Between 1938 and 1939, he was the personal secretary to Avhustyn Voloshyn, the nominal Prime-Minister of Carpatho-Ukraine during its several days of independence in March 1939 before it was occupied by Hungary following the First Vienna Award. Rohach was an active supporter and member of the Ukrainian scouting movement, Plast.

=== Political career ===
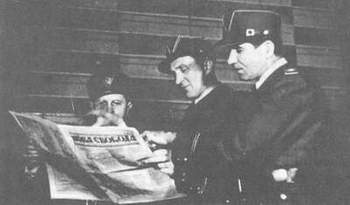
Ivan Rohach, Ivan Roman and Fedir Tatsynets in uniforms of the Carpathian Sich, 1938

Rohach was a prolific writer of political pamphlets and short stories dealing with various aspects of religion, human morality, the national question, and the cause for Ukrainian self-determination. He was a member of the Organization of Ukrainian Nationalists (OUN) and a supporter of the Andriy Melnyk faction (OUN-M). He moved to Kyiv during the German occupation in order to aid in the re-establishment of a Ukrainian administration in the nation's capital.

In January 1942, Rohach became the co-editor of the newspaper Nove Ukrainske Slovo ("New Ukrainian Word") and the magazine Lytavry ("Tympani"), which united those active in Ukrainian culture and arts in Kyiv. The newspaper expressed strong antisemitic sentiments. In 1941, the paper described Jews as the "greatest enemy of the people."

=== Arrest and execution ===
In 1941, Rohach was briefly arrested by the Gestapo during a crackdown on Ukrainian nationalist activities, after he and others refused unconditional cooperation with the Germans. In January 1942, Rohach was allegedly taken to Babi Yar where he, along with his sister, Anna (Hanna), and his entire staff, was executed although the precise location of his execution is disputed by modern historians. Per Anders Rudling concludes that the method or location of the executions is unknown but that their bodies probably ended up at Babi Yar.

== Legacy ==
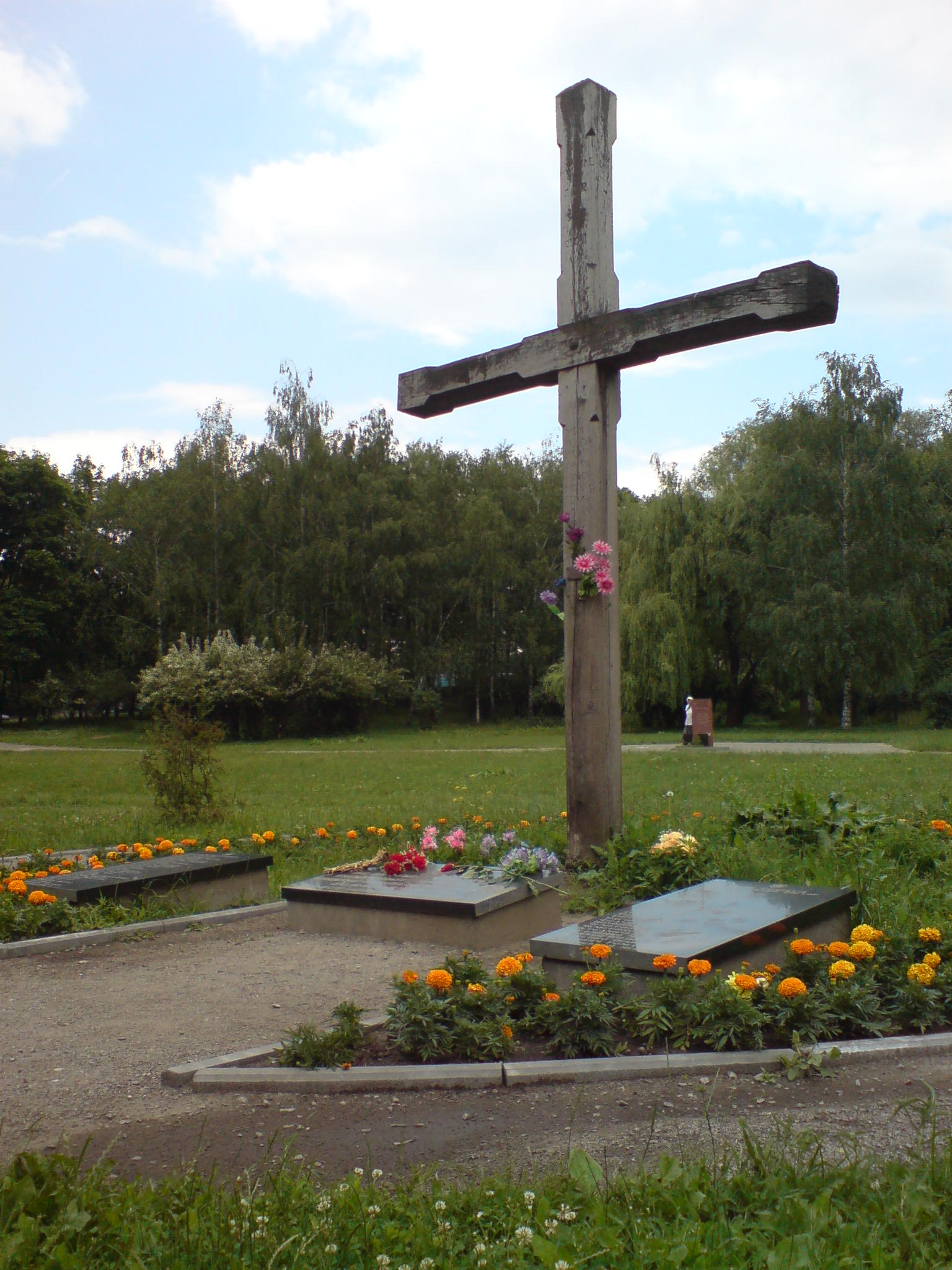
Wooden cross in Babi Yar in memory of Olena Teliha and other Ukrainian nationalists executed there in 1942

Poems from his collection of poetry Brosti have been set to music. A number of the songs have been included in the Plast song book U mandry ("To wander") and continue to be sung by Ukrainian scouts today.

In 1992, a wooden cross memorial was erected in memory of Olena Teliha and executed OUN members. It is located in Babi Yar south of Yuriia Illienka Street (formerly until 2018 Melnyk/Melnykov Street) at Oleny Telihy Street in northwestern part of Kyiv near Dorohozhychi subway station. Rohach's name is the 6th from the top on the right side marble plaque.
