= Vasyl Grendzha-Donsky =

Ukrainian writer (1897–1974)

Vasyl Stepanovych Grendzha-Donskyi
- Василь Степанович Ґренджа-Донський
- Born: 24 April 1897 village of Volove, Austria-Hungary
- Died: 25 November 1974 (aged 77); Bratislava, Czechoslovakia

Vasyl Grendzha-Donsky (Ukrainian: Ґренджа-Донський Василь Степанович; 24 April 1897, in (now town of Mizhhirya), Máramaros County, Austria-Hungary – 25 November 1974, in Bratislava, Czechoslovakia) was a Ukrainian writer, translator, pamphleteer and editor of several Transcarpathian newspapers and magazines. Also he was politician and activist, one of the creators of Carpatho-Ukraine.

== Biography ==
Vasyl Grendzha-Donsky had born in a typical Verkhovynian family. After leaving of public school in Volove, he had to stop studying due to lack of money. His father had caught a cold at the forest working and since that moment was down with this illness, so he had not money for son's education. Being an adolescent, Vasyl worked as a dyak's helper. In 1912 Vasyl became a mail carrier for food and shelter in placement of office. At the leisure he was getting self-education and took an exam for whole course of contemporary school, also he learnt the Hungarian language.

In 1915 Vasyl was called up for military service, before long he had badly injured at the fronts of WW1, then he was cured in Budapest. After rehabilitation Grendzha-Donsky was at war again and participated as an officer in Hungarian revolution. During the treatment, Vasyl took exams for two courses of Trade Academy due to self-education, and after the war – for the third and the last.

In 1921 Grendzha-Donsky returned to Zakarpattia and start literature activity. His name is concerned with development and establishment of national revival in Zakarpattia. His collection of poems Kvity z terniam (Flowers with blackthorn), published in 1923, was the first regional book of the secularity author written in the Ukrainian literary language. The other book – Shliakhom ternovym (By the way of blackthorns; year of publication – 1924) was the first book published with the Ukrainian phonetic spelling.

Then several Grendzha-Donsky's books had appeared: a collections of poems Zoloti kliuchi (Golden Keys; 1923), Ternovi kvity polonyn (Blackthorn Flowers of The Polonynas; 1928), Tobi, ridnyi krayu (For You, My Native Land; 1936), Collection of short stories from the Carpathian polonynas (1926), Covering with the fog of the singing rivers... (1928), the historical poem Chervona skala (The Red Cliff; 1930), the historical novel Ilko Lypei, the Carpathian Robber and others.

During all life Vasyl Grendzha-Donsky had been working as a financier, firstly in Budapest, then in Uzhhorod in Podkarpatsky Bank until autumn of 1938. From autumn of 1938 to 16 March 1939 – during a period of Carpatho-Ukraine – he was a figure of the country and an editor of The Official Gazette of Carpatho-Ukraine. After the occupation of this land by Hungary Grendzha-Donsky was hardly executed in prisons and concentration camps. On 7 August 1939, he fled to Bratislava (Slovakia), where he worked as an accountant.

The spirit of Carpatho-Ukraine was existing in his soul until the end of life. By the way, his daughter Alice Grendzha-Donska was a nurse during the struggle for this state in 1938–1939 and cared for the wounded. Vasyl Grendha-Donsky wrote a book of memoirs "Happiness and the Mountain of Carpathian Ukraine. Diary. Memoirs". It had dedicated to events devoted to the development of the Carpatho-Ukraine.

Vasyl Grendzha-Donskyi died on 25 November 1974 in Bratislava.
