= Freiwillige Schutzstaffel =

German paramilitary organization in Slovakia

FS symbol

Freiwillige Schutzstaffel ('Voluntary Protection Corps', abbreviated FS) was a paramilitary organization in the World War II Slovak Republic. FS was founded in late 1938. Modelled on the German Sturmabteilung (SA) and the Allgemeine SS, FS organized members of the German community in Slovakia. It functioned as the paramilitary wing of the German Party (DP). Walter Donath served as the national commander (Landesführer) of FS.

Two government regulations issued in 1939 provided the legal cover for FS; decree no. 240 issued September 27, 1939 and decree no. 311 issued December 21, 1939. Through the latter decree the Slovak government recognized FS and the German Youth (DJ) as paramilitary organizations operating in the frame of the German Party. FS members were assigned to protect infrastructure (bridges, tunnels, railway stations) and persecuted deserters from the Polish front. FS also sent fighters to take part in the German war effort against Poland. Along with its Slovak counterpart, the Hlinka Guard, FS conducted attacks against the Jewish communities in Slovakia.

As of March 1939 FS was organized into three Sturmbannen ('Strike Battalions'). The title of the commander of a Sturmbann was Sturmbannführer ('Strike Battalion Leader'). The geographic area covered by a Sturmbann corresponded to the territorial units of the German Party: Pressburg (Bratislava), Kremnitz-Deutsch Proben (Kremnica - Nemecké Pravno) and Zips. At this point FS had 4,604 members. At the time of its foundation FS membership was open to ethnic German males aged 18–35, who could provide proof of Aryan lineage three generations back. In June 1941 membership was opened up to party members up to the age of 50. The uniform of FS was largely identical to that of Allgemeine SS. Its symbol was an eagle carrying a shield with a swastika (the shield with swastika was the symbol of the German Party).

On February 15, 1940, the number of Sturmbannen was increased to six;

- I. - Pressburg (urban), Commander Hans Hofstäter, 3 companies
- II. - Pressburg (rural), Commander Zoltan Absalon, 4 companies
- III. - Kremnitz, Commander Jozef Jacklin, 7 companies
- IV. - Deutsch Proben, Commander Ladislav Wässerle, 4 companies
- V. - Oberzips, Commander Willi Kunzmann, 6 companies
- VI. - Unterzips, Commander Hans Dolinsky, 4 companies.

However, the six Sturmbannen did not cover all of the FS membership. In areas with small German populations, FS members adhered directly to the national headquarters of FS. At this point FS had 4,622 members. As of early 1941 FS membership stood at around 5,500, by October 1941 it stood at 6,810. FS was again reorganized on September 14, 1942, with the creation of a seventh Sturmbann in Považie. From that point onwards all FS members were included into a Sturmbann.

FS participated, along with the Hlinka Guard, in the deportation of Jews from Slovakia in 1942.

Not all FS members were in active military service, by late 1942 5,832 out of 7,646 FS members were in active service. And whilst membership in FS continued to increase throughout the war (7,818 in mid-1944), the percentage of FS members in active service declined (4,179 in mid-1944). The decline was a result of recruitment into Waffen-SS. In this process the German Party leadership gradually lost some of its influence over FS, as the organization became increasingly subordinated to SS. In 1943 Donath left his post as FS commander to fight on the Eastern Front. F. Klug, hitherto leader of the German Youth organization, was named the new FS commander.

Again in 1944 FS participated in deportations of Jews from Slovakia.

== See also ==
- Slovakia during World War II
