= Ukrainian National Union (1939) =

Ukrainian political party (1939)

Ukrainian National Union Українське Національне Об'єднання
- The Tryzub, a Ukrainian national symbol used by the UNO
- Abbreviation: UNO / УНО
- Chairman: Fedir Revai
- Founded: 20 January 1939; 87 years ago
- Dissolved: 18 March 1939; 87 years ago
- Headquarters: Khust
- Newspaper: Nova Svoboda
- Membership (January 1939): 5,000
- Ideology: Ukrainian nationalism
- Slogan: "Ukraine — above all!"

The Ukrainian National Union (Ukrainian: Українське Національне Об'єднання, romanized: Ukrayins'ke Natsional'ne Ob'yednannya, abbreviated UNO / УНО) was a Ukrainian political party that governed the short-lived state of Carpatho-Ukraine from January to March 1939. The party was headquartered in Khust.

The UNO was created in January 1939 after the Carpatho-Ukrainian government banned all political parties to curb communist influence in the autonomous region of Czechoslovakia. The UNO won all 32 seats in the 1939 Soim election and received over 92 percent of the vote. A Ukrainian nationalist political party, the UNO supported the unification of all Ukrainians into a single nation. The party ceased to exist following the Hungarian invasion and occupation of Carpatho-Ukraine in March 1939.

== History ==
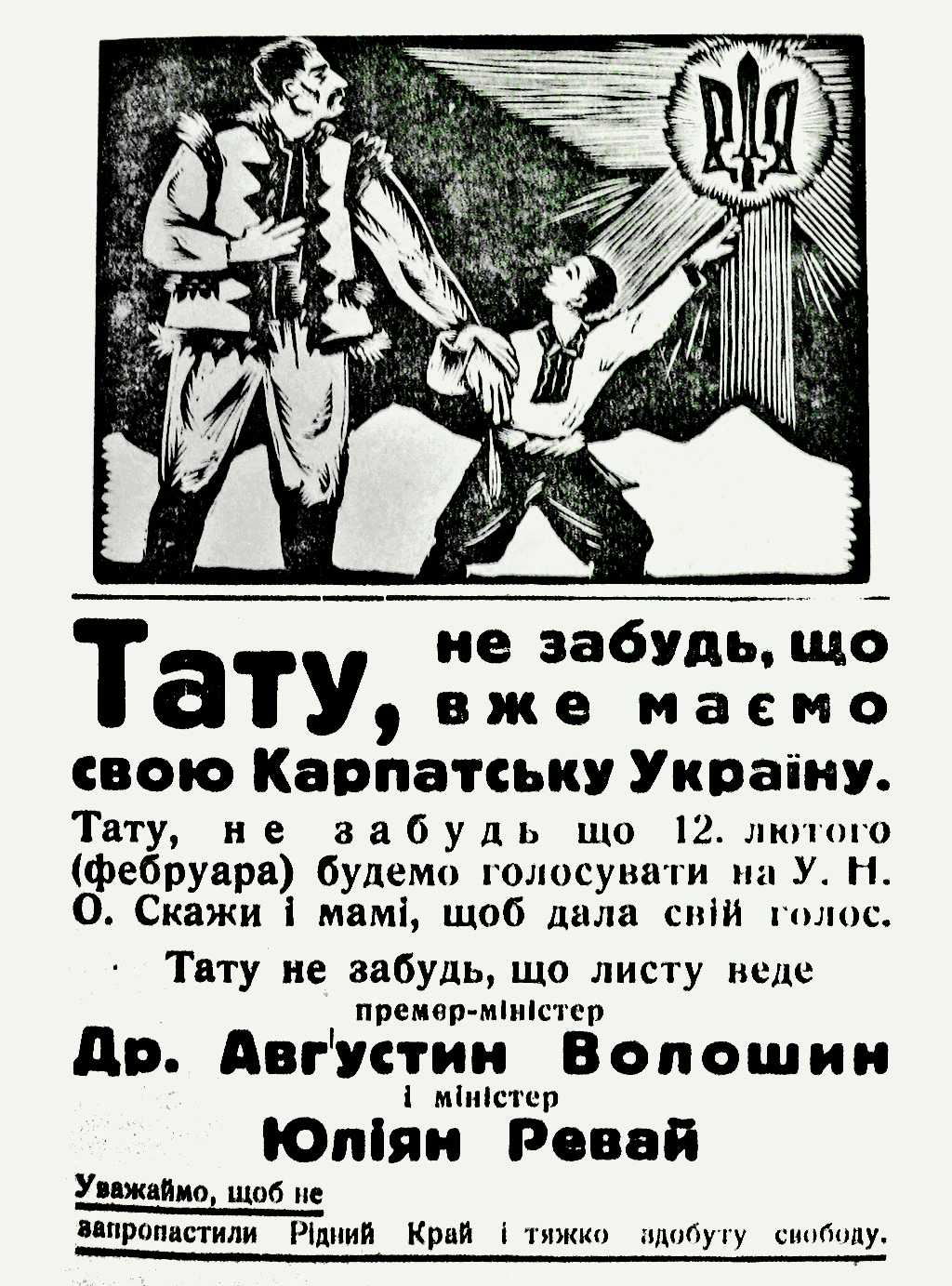
A poster calling on Ukrainian families to vote for the UNO in the February 1939 election

On 20 January 1939, the government of Carpatho-Ukraine, an autonomous region of Czechoslovakia, issued a decree that dissolved all political parties. This was done to curb the political influence of communists affiliated with the Communist Party of Czechoslovakia on the basis that their activity threatened public security. Avgustyn Voloshyn, the leader of Carpatho-Ukraine, allowed 56 politicians to create a new political party named the Ukrainian National Union (UNO). The Czechoslovak government approved of the UNO's creation. Around 5,000 people joined the party within two days.

The UNO's leadership was appointed on 24 January. Fedir Revai, the chairman of the Ukrainian Central People's Council (a body that had supported the creation of the autonomous Carpatho-Ukraine in 1938), was the UNO's leader. Nova Svoboda, the party's newspaper, was also established on that date. On 27 January, the UNO created a list of 32 candidates to be elected to the Soim, the legislature of Carpatho-Ukraine. The UNO received 92.4 percent of the vote on 92.5 percent turnout during the 12 February election. Ukrainian historians Stepan Pakholko and Ol'ha Martyn described the election as having been conducted freely.

On 14 March, Voloshyn declared Carpatho-Ukrainian independence from Czechoslovakia. He hoped that Carpatho-Ukraine would become a German protectorate. That same day, Hungary launched an invasion of Carpatho-Ukraine. The UNO failed to rally a popular resistance to the Hungarian invasion, and by 18 March, Hungary gained full control of Carpatho-Ukraine. The UNO subsequently ceased to exist.

== Ideology ==
The UNO was a Ukrainian nationalist organization and wanted to create a "strong national-Ukrainian society" ("міцне національно-українське суспільство"). It sought to emulate the political structure used by Nazi Germany where a single political party rallies around a strong national leader, with Nova Svoboda publishing on 24 February that "We have not yet seen a Ukrainian Mussolini or a Ukrainian Hitler" ("У нас ще не з'явився ні український Муссоліні, ні український Гітлер").

== Structure ==
The following table lists the UNO's leaders and the positions they held within the party. All were appointed on 24 January 1939.

Party office	Officeholder
Chairman	Fedir Revai
Deputy Chairman	Mykhailo Tulyk
Honorary Chairman	Avgustyn Voloshyn
General-Secretary	Andriy Voron
Secretary	Ivan Rohach
Editor	Vasyl Grendzha-Donsky
Propaganda Director	V. Komarinsky
Controllers	M. Babota; Mykola Bandusyak

The UNO was headquartered in Khust and had several subservient organizations. Knightly Virtues of the Nation was its youth organization; the Carpathian Sich was its paramilitary; and Re-Emigration of the Sons of Our Land promoted the unification of all Ukrainians into a single nation. The UNO had an affiliate group in Canada led by Ukrainian immigrants. The party's slogan was "Ukraine — above all!" ("Україна — понад усе!").

== Electoral history ==
=== Soim ===
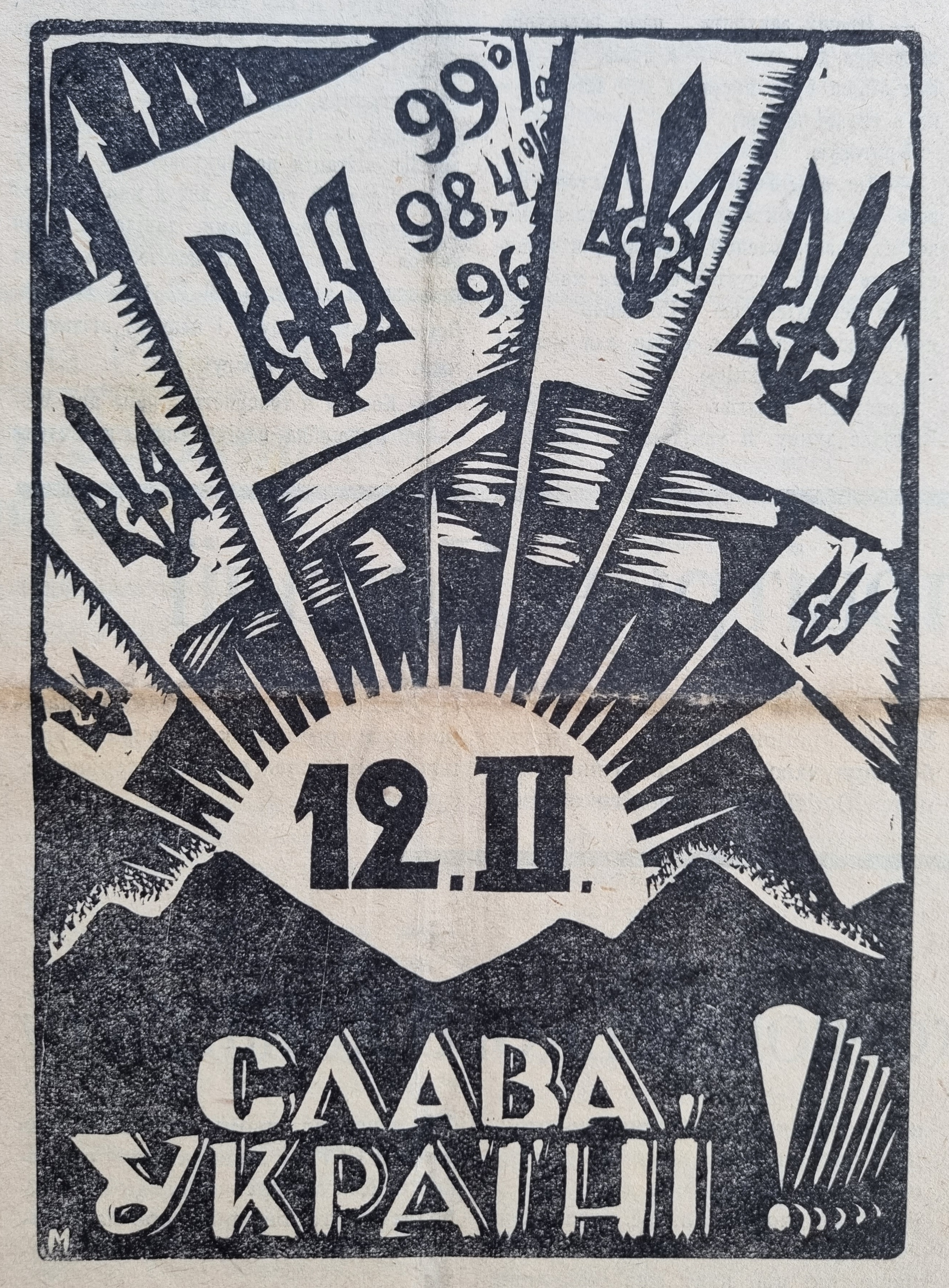
A poster celebrating the UNO's victory in the February 1939 election

Election	Votes	%	Position	Seats	+/–	Status in legislature	Ref.
1939		92.4	▲1st	32 / 32	New	Sole party	

== See also ==
- List of political parties in Ukraine
