= Second Czechoslovak Republic =

Czechoslovak state from 1938 to 1939

Czecho-Slovak Republic Česko-Slovenská republika
- 1938–1939
- Flag Coat of arms
- Motto: Pravda vítězí / Pravda víťazí "Truth prevails"
- Anthem: Kde domov můj (Czech); Where Is My Home "Nad Tatrou sa blýska"; (English: "Lightning Over the Tatras")
- Czechoslovak Republic at the beginning of 1939
- Status: Rump state
- Capital: Prague
- Common languages: Czechoslovak (Czech and Slovak)
- Demonym: Czechoslovak
- Government: Parliamentary republic under an authoritarian government
- President
  - 1938: Edvard Beneš
  - 1938: Vacant
  - 1938–1939: Emil Hácha
- Prime Minister
  - 1938: Jan Syrový
  - 1938–1939: Rudolf Beran
- Legislature: National Assembly
  - Upper house: Senate
  - Lower house: Chamber of Deputies
- Historical era: Interwar period
  - Munich Agreement: 30 September 1938
  - Slovak State declared: 14 March 1939
  - German occupation: 15 March 1939
- Currency: Czechoslovak koruna
Preceded by
First Czechoslovak Republic
Succeeded by
Protectorate of Bohemia and Moravia
Slovak Republic
Carpatho-Ukraine
Provisional Government of Czechoslovakia
- Today part of: Czech Republic; Slovakia; Ukraine

The Second Czechoslovak Republic (Czech and Slovak: Druhá Česko-Slovenská republika), officially the Czecho-Slovak Republic (Czech and Slovak: Česko-Slovenská republika), was a country that existed for 169 days, between 30 September 1938 and 15 March 1939, initially as a de jure unitary state that functioned as a de facto federal state before reorganizing as an asymmetrical federation in November 1938. As a federal state, it was composed of Bohemia, Moravia, Silesia and the autonomous regions of Slovakia and Subcarpathian Rus', the latter being renamed Carpathian Ukraine on 30 December 1938.

The Second Republic was the result of the events following the Munich Agreement, where the First Republic was forced to cede the German-populated Sudetenland region to Germany on 1 October 1938. After the Munich Agreement and the German government made clear to foreign diplomats that Czechoslovakia was now a German client state, the Czechoslovak government attempted to curry favour with Germany by banning the country's Communist Party, suspending all Jewish teachers in German educational institutes in Czechoslovakia, and enacted a law to allow the state to take over Jewish companies. In addition, the government allowed the country's banks to effectively come under German–Czechoslovak control. On 2 November, by the First Vienna Award, the southern parts of Slovakia and Subcarpathian Ruthenia were ceded to Hungary.

The Second Republic was dissolved when Germany invaded it on 15 March 1939, and annexed the Czech region into the Protectorate of Bohemia and Moravia. On the same day as the German occupation, the President of Czechoslovakia, Emil Hácha, was appointed by the German government as the State President of the Protectorate of Bohemia and Moravia, a position he held throughout the war.

== History ==
Czechoslovakia had become a shell of its former self and was now a greatly weakened state. The Munich Agreement had resulted in Bohemia and Moravia losing about 38 percent of their combined area to Germany, with some 3.2 million German and 750,000 Czech inhabitants. Lacking its natural frontier and having lost its costly system of border fortification, the new state was militarily indefensible.

Hungary received 11,882 km^{2} (4,588 sq mi) in southern Slovakia and southern Ruthenia; according to a 1941 census, about 86.5 percent of the population in this territory was Hungarian. Poland acquired the town of Těšín with the surrounding area — some 906 km^{2} (350 sq mi), some 250,000 inhabitants, mostly Poles — and two minor border areas in northern Slovakia, more precisely in the regions Spiš and Orava – 226 km^{2} (87 sq mi), 4,280 inhabitants, only 0.3 percent Poles. The Czechoslovak government had problems in taking care of the 115,000 Czech and 30,000 German refugees, who had fled to the remaining rump of Czechoslovakia.

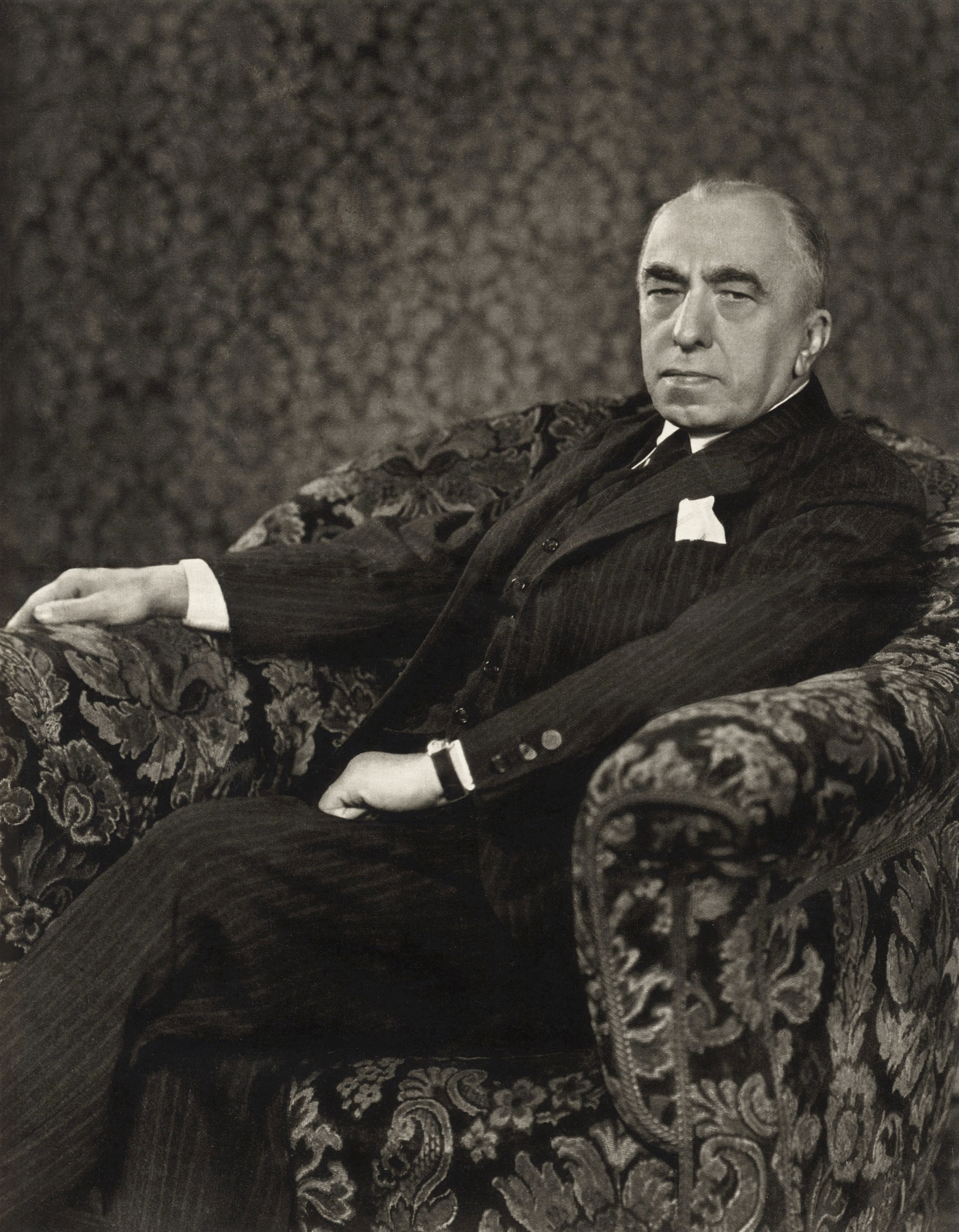
Emil Hácha, President of the Second Czechoslovak Republic

The political system of the country was also in chaos. Following the resignation of Edvard Beneš on 5 October, Prime Minister Jan Syrový took over most presidential duties — as per the Constitution — until Emil Hácha was chosen as President on 30 November 1938. Hácha was chosen because of his Catholicism and conservatism and because of not being involved in any government that led to the partition of the country. He appointed Rudolf Beran, the leader of the Agrarian Party since 1933, as prime minister on 1 December 1938.

Unlike most Agrarians, Beran was sceptical of liberalism and democracy. The Communist Party was dissolved, although its members were allowed to remain in Parliament. Tough censorship was introduced, and an Enabling Act was also introduced, which allowed the government to rule without parliament. Most of the non-socialist parties in the Czech Lands merged into the Party of National Unity, with Beran as leader.

== Ethnic tensions ==
The greatly weakened Czechoslovak Republic was forced to grant major concessions to the non-Czechs. Following the Munich Agreement, the Czechoslovak army transferred parts of its units, originally in the Czech lands, to Slovakia, meant to counter the obvious Hungarian attempts to revise the Slovak borders.

The Czechoslovak government accepted the Žilina Agreement stipulating the formation of an autonomous Slovak government with all Slovak parties except the Social Democrats on 6 October 1938. Jozef Tiso was nominated as its head. The only common ministries that remained were those of National Defence, Foreign Affairs and Finances.

Similarly, the two major factions in Subcarpathian Ruthenia, the Russophiles and Ukrainophiles, agreed on the establishment of an autonomous government, which was constituted on 8 October 1938. Reflecting the spread of modern Ukrainian national consciousness, the pro-Ukrainian faction, led by Avhustyn Voloshyn, gained control of the local government and Subcarpathian Ruthenia was renamed Carpatho-Ukraine.

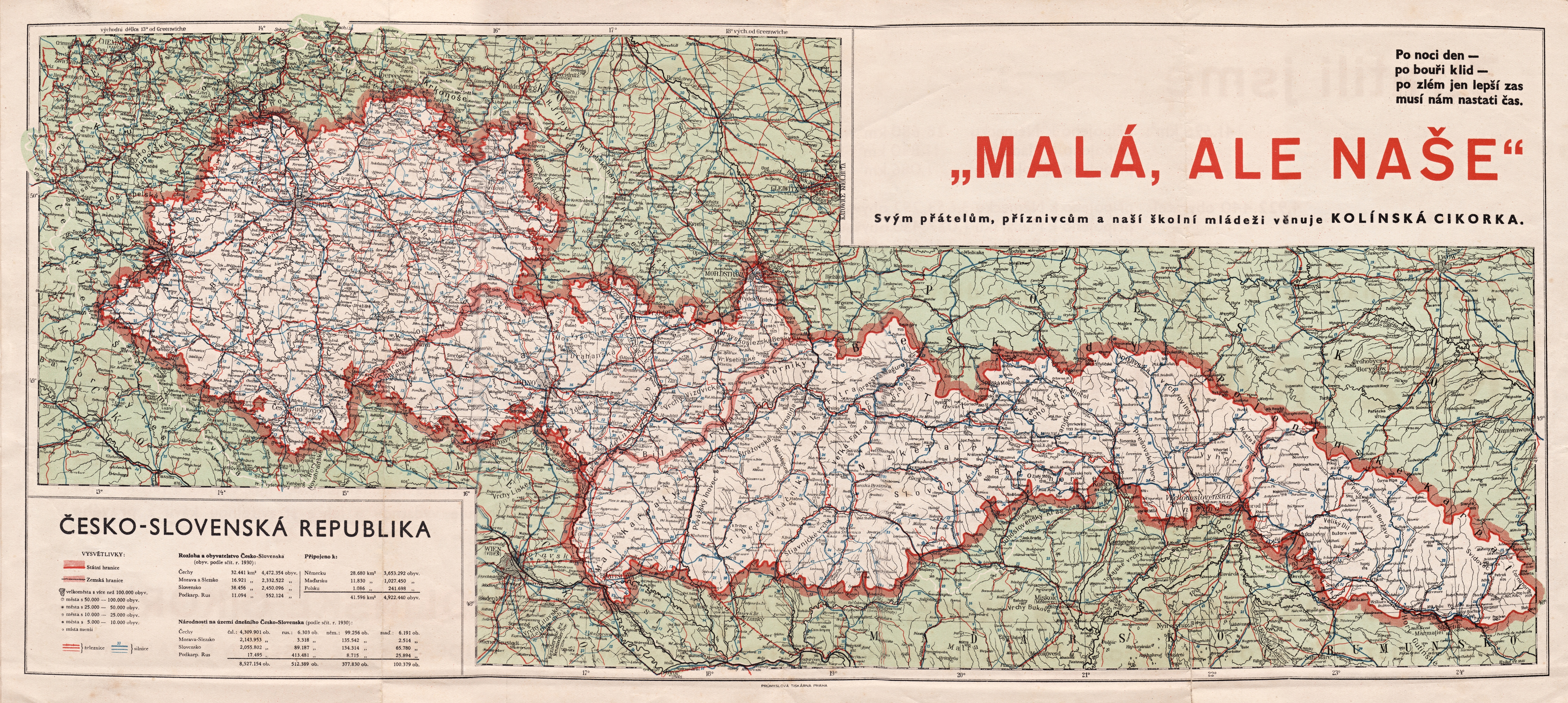
"Small, but our own" – contemporary map of the Second Republic

Czechoslovakia officially became a federal state on 23 November when the country was renamed with a hyphen (Czecho-Slovakia) and the constitution was amended for the creation of the Autonomous Land of Slovakia. On 1 January 1939, the Slovak State Assembly was opened. On 18 January, the first elections of the Slovak Assembly took place, where the Party of Slovak National Unity, a merger of all nonsocialist Slovak parties, received 98 percent of the votes.

On 12 February, Vojtech Tuka and Franz Karmasin met with Adolf Hitler, and on 22 February, Tiso proposed the formation of an autonomous Slovak state during his presentation of the Slovak Government to the assembly. On 27 February, the Slovak government asked the central government for the Slovakisation of the Czecho-Slovak army units stationed in Slovakia and for Slovak ambassadors and consuls to be named as representatives of the autonomous Slovak state.

Disputes continued and, on 1 March 1939, the Ministerial Committee of the Czecho-Slovak government met, where the question of Slovak departure from the state was in focus. There were some disagreement between Tiso and other Slovak politicians, and Karol Sidor (who had represented the Slovak government in the meeting) returned to Bratislava to discuss the matter with Tiso. On 6 March, the Slovak government proclaimed its loyalty to the Czecho-Slovak Republic and its wish to remain a part of the state.

In a meeting with Hermann Göring on 7 March, Ďurčanský and Tuka were pressed to declare their autonomy from the Czecho-Slovak state. After their return two days later, the Hlinka Guard was mobilised, which in turn forced the Czecho-Slovak President, Emil Hácha, to react strongly and declared martial law in Slovakia.

== Division of Czechoslovakia ==
In January 1939, negotiations between Germany and Poland broke down. Hitler scheduled an invasion of Bohemia and Moravia for the morning of 15 March. In the interim, he negotiated with the Slovak People's Party and with the Kingdom of Hungary and its representatives for the Hungarian minority in Slovakia to prepare the dismemberment of the Second Czechoslovak Republic before the invasion.

On 13 March, he invited Jozef Tiso to Berlin, where he offered Tiso the option of proclaiming the Slovak state and seceding from Czecho-Slovakia. In such a case, Germany would be Slovakia's protector and would not allow the Hungarians to press on Slovakia any additional territorial demands. If the Slovaks declined, Germany would occupy Bohemia and Moravia and disinterest himself in Slovakia's fate — in effect, leaving the Slovaks to the mercies of the Hungarians and the Poles (Poland had claimed the Slovak Spiš territory since the Polish-Czechoslovak War). During the meeting, Joachim von Ribbentrop passed on a false report saying that Hungarian troops were approaching Slovak borders. Tiso refused to make such a decision himself, after which he was allowed by Hitler to organize a meeting of the Slovak parliament ("Diet of the Slovak Land"), which would approve Slovakia's independence.

On 14 March, the Slovak parliament convened and heard Tiso's report on his discussion with Hitler as well as a declaration of independence. Some of the deputies were skeptical of making such a move, but the debate was quickly quashed when Karmasin stated that any delay in declaring independence would result in Slovakia being divided between Hungary and Germany. Under these circumstances, Parliament unanimously declared Slovak independence, and Tiso was appointed the first Prime Minister of the new republic. The next day, Tiso sent a telegram (which had actually been composed the previous day in Berlin) asking the Third Reich to take over the protection of the newly minted state. The request was readily accepted.

Meanwhile, Czechoslovak President Emil Hácha was summoned to a meeting with Adolf Hitler and Hermann Göring during the early hours of 15 March, and informed of the imminent Nazi invasion plan. Here, Hácha was threatened with aerial bombardment of Prague unless he signed a document accepting the capitulation of the Czechoslovak Army and the foundation of a Protectorate of Bohemia and Moravia under the protection and supremacy of the German Reich. After possibly suffering a heart attack, Hácha finally succumbed to these threats and signed the document, without consulting parliament.

On the morning of 15 March, German troops entered Bohemia and Moravia, meeting no resistance. The Hungarian occupation of Carpatho-Ukraine did encounter resistance but the Hungarian army quickly crushed it. On 16 March, Hitler went to Czechoslovakia and from Prague Castle proclaimed the new Protectorate of Bohemia and Moravia. Independent Czechoslovakia collapsed in the wake of foreign aggression, ethnic divisions and internal tensions. Subsequently, interwar Czechoslovakia has been idealized by its proponents as the only bastion of democracy surrounded by authoritarian and fascist regimes − this is called the Czechoslovakia myth. It has also been condemned by its detractors as an artificial, Czech-dominated and unworkable creation of intellectuals supported by the great victorious powers of the First World War, notably the French Third Republic and the British Empire.

Interwar Czechoslovakia comprised lands and peoples that were far from being integrated into a modern nation-state. Moreover, the dominant Czechs were not able to cope with the demands of other nationalities. After the Second World War, Czechoslovakia was re-established and regained almost all of its territory, with the exception of Subcarpathian Ruthenia, which was annexed by the Soviet Union, and the small portions of territory of Slovakia annexed by Poland.

== Bibliography ==
- Gebhart, J.; Kuklík, J. (2004). Druhá republika 1938–1939 (in Czech). Prague: Litomyšl. ISBN 9788071856269.
- Kennan, G. F. (1968). From Prague after Munich: Diplomatic Papers, 1938–1939. Princeton University Press. ISBN 9780691010632.
- Rychlík, J.; Rychlíková, M. (2016). Podkarpatská Rus v dějinách Československa, 1918–1946 (in Czech). Prague: Vyšehrad. ISBN 9788074295560.
