= Deutscher Aufbaudienst =

D.A.D. symbol

Deutscher Aufbaudienst ('German Construction Service', abbreviated D.A.D.) was an organization of ethnic Germans in Slovakia during World War II, organizing volunteer labour for construction efforts. German sources claimed 19,725 persons participated in the D.A.D. brigades of 1941.

In the summer of 1941 a women's wing of D.A.D. was set up under the leadership of Edith Neumann.

Amongst the buildings constructed by the D.A.D. labour brigades was a sports stadium in Bratislava. Participants in the labour brigades were awarded pins with the D.A.D. symbol in bronze, silver or gild, depending on how many hours of volunteer labour they contributed with.

== See also ==
- German Party (Slovakia)
- Reichsarbeitsdienst
