= Stepan Klochurak =

Ukrainian politician (1895–1980)

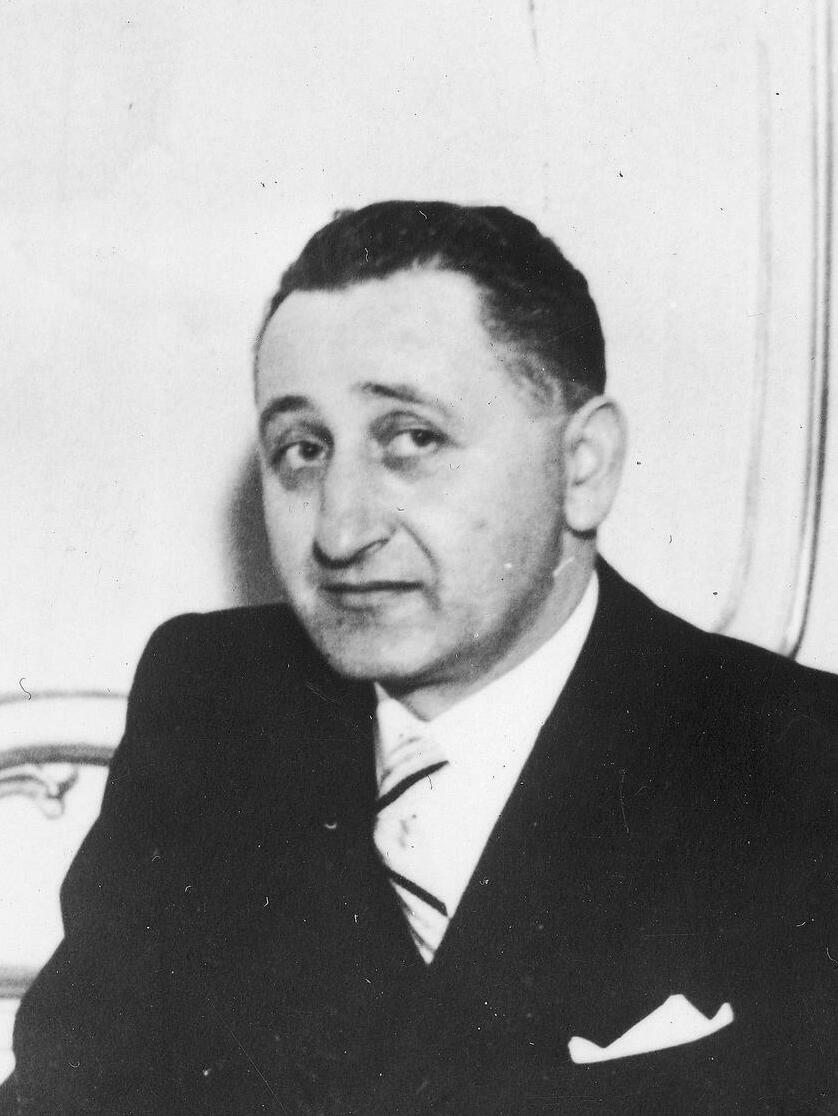
- Stepan Klochurak during a meeting with Czechoslovak president Emil Hácha, 1939
- Born: 27 February 1895; Kőrösmező, Austria-Hungary (now Yasinia, Ukraine)
- Died: 8 February 1980 (aged 84); Prague, Czechoslovakia
- Resting place: Olšany Cemetery, Prague
- Term: 1919 Prime Minister of the Hutsul Republic
- Political party: Social Democratic (1920s); Agrarian-Republican (1930s); Ukrainian National Union (1939)

Stepan Klochurak (Rusyn and Ukrainian: Степан Клочурак) (27 February 1895 - 8 February 1980) was a Transcarpathian public activist, politician and lawyer. He was the Prime Minister of the short lived Hutsul Republic in 1919.

== Biography ==
Born in Yasinia, Máramaros County, Klochurak specialized in law, and in 1918-1919 became one of the organizers of the Hutsul Republic in his native settlement. After joining the Social democratic movement, he served as the editor-in-chief of the Vpered ("Forward") newspaper. Klochurak later joined the Ukrainian fraction of the Agrarian Party, and in 1934 became the editor of its printed publication Zemlia i Volia ("Land and Freedom").

In 1939 Klochurak was elected member of parliament of Carpatho-Ukraine, and served as Minister of Defense. Later during that year he emigrated to Prague. In 1945 he was arrested by NKVD and imprisoned in Gulag near Vorkuta until 1957. Klochurak died in 1980 in Prague.

He is a relative of Halina Pawlowská.

== Awards ==
- Order of Liberty (March 14, 2019, posthumously)

== Memoirs ==
Klochurak, Stepan (1978). Do Voli (Strive for freedom: memories) (book) (in Ukrainian). New York: The Carpathian Alliance. OCLC 17608529.
