= Autonomous Land of Slovakia =

1938–39 autonomous republic within the Second Czechoslovak Republic

Autonomous Land of Slovakia Slovenská autonómna krajina
- 1938–1939
- Flag Coat of arms

- Second Czechoslovak Republic in 1939

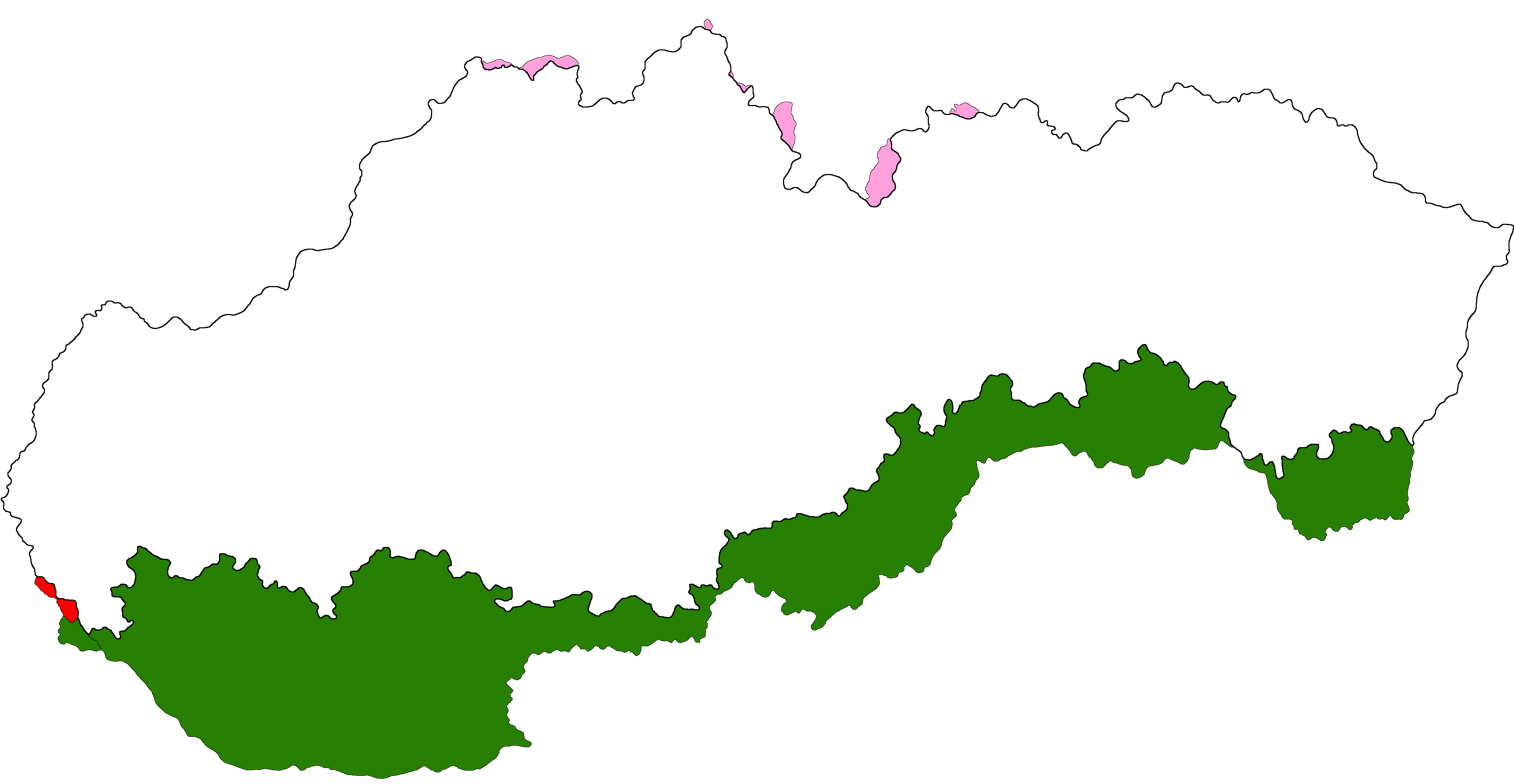
- Map of the Autonomous Lands of Slovakia
- Status: Autonomous Republic within the Second Czechoslovak Republic
- Capital: Bratislava
- Common languages: Slovak
- Demonym: Slovak
- Prime Minister
  - 1938-1939: Jozef Tiso
- Legislature: Slovak Land Assembly
- Historical era: Interwar Period
  - Amendment of Czechoslovak Constitution: 23 November 1938
  - Establishment of Slovak Republic: 14 March 1939
- ISO 3166 code: SK
Preceded by	Succeeded by
First Czechoslovak Republic	Slovak Republic
- Today part of: Slovakia

The Autonomous Land of Slovakia was an autonomous republic within the Second Czechoslovak Republic. It existed briefly from 23 November 1938 to 14 March 1939, when it declared independence from Czechoslovakia as the Slovak Republic, due to mounting pressure from Nazi Germany. The entity was led by Jozef Tiso.

== Creation ==
The Autonomous Land of Slovakia was established on 23 November 1938, following the enforcement of Constitutional Act No. 299/1938. It was drafted by the leaders of the nationalist Slovak People's Party in July 1938, and submitted to the National Assembly on 17 August 1938. Its main draftsmen were deputies Andrej Hlinka (died August 16, 1938), Karol Sidor, Martin Sokol and Jozef Tiso.

This amendment of the Constitution effectively established a federal republic, named Czecho-Slovakia, instead of the previous spelling of Czechoslovakia. It also established the Slovak Land Assembly as Slovakia's supreme legislative body.
