= Velyki Luchky =

Velyki Luchky Великі Лучки Velké Loučky • Nagylucska • Veľké Lúčky
- Village
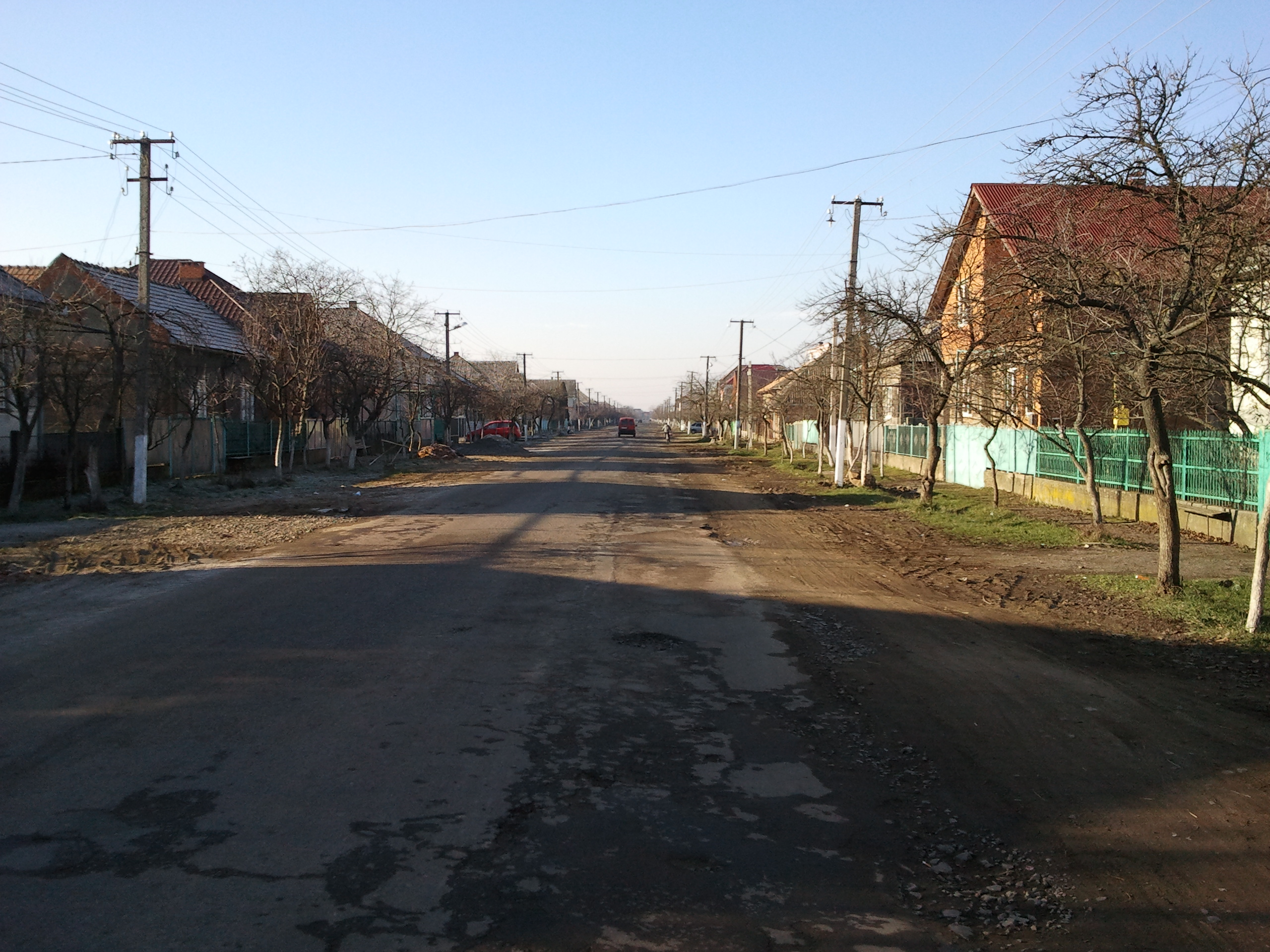
- Velyki Luchky

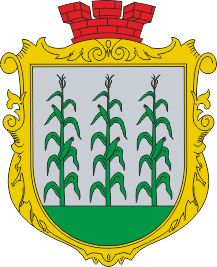
- Coat of arms
- Interactive map of Velyki Luchky
- Location within Zakarpattia Oblast Location within Ukraine
- Country: Ukraine
- Oblast: Zakarpattia Oblast
- Raion: Mukachevo Raion
- Hromada: Velyki Luchky rural hromada
- Founded: 1400

Area
  - Total: 8.23 km^{2} (3.18 sq mi)
- Elevation: 110 m (360 ft)

Population (2001)
  - Total: 9,028
  - Density: 1,100/km^{2} (2,840/sq mi)
- Time zone: UTC+2 (EET)
  - Summer (DST): UTC+3 (EEST)
- Postal code: 89625
- Area code: +380 3131
- KOATUU: 2122781201
- KATOTTH: UA21040010010026102

Velyki Luchky (Ukrainian: Великі Лучки, Czech: Velké Loučky, Hungarian: Nagylucska, Slovak: Veľké Lúčky) is a village in the Mukachevo Raion (district) in the Zakarpattia Oblast (province) in southwestern Ukraine.

== History ==
Historically, it was part of the Kingdom of Hungary. Between WWI and WWII, it was part of Carpathian Ruthenia, Czechoslovakia. After WWII, it was part of the Ukrainian Soviet Socialist Republic, which was one of the republics of the Soviet Union.

Velyki Luchky has been part of independent Ukraine since 1991.

=== Jewish Life ===
The Jewish population was decimated during WWII. The Jewish community of the village continued up to the mid 70s, when the majority were allowed to leave the Soviet Union and migrated to Israel and the USA.

== Culture ==
The village has Preschool №1, Preschool №2, the Velykoluchkivska Gymnasium, and the Velykoluchkivska Secondary School I-III.

There are also libraries, a cultural center, a club, many shops (for a village), and many other cultural and entertainment facilities. In addition, there is the Velykoluchkivska Children's School of Arts.

The village also has a 100-hectare plantation where Blueberry varieties "Bluecrop" and "Liberty" are grown, which are considered resistant to any diseases and have a very long shelf life. The products are certified according to the international standards GlobalGAP and Halal.

== Population ==
According to the 1989 Ukrainian SSR census, the village had a population of 8,778, of which 4,191 were men and 4,587 were women.

According to the 2001 Ukrainian census, the village had a population of 9,029 people.

=== Languages ===
Distribution of the population by native language according to the 2001 census:

Language	Percentage
Ukrainian	95,99 %
Hungarian	3,48 %
Russian	0,35 %
Belarusian	0,06 %
Romanian	0,03 %
Slovak	0,01 %
Romani	0,01 %

== Coat of arms ==
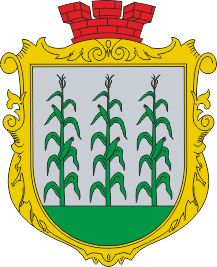
Velyki Luchky's coat of arms

Velyki Luchky has its own coat of arms with three stalks of corn on a silver background.
