= Franz Karmasin =

German politician in Czechoslovakia

Franz Karmasin (2 September 1901 – 25 June 1970) was an ethnic German politician in Czechoslovakia, who helped found the Carpathian German Party. During World War II he was state secretary of German affairs in the Slovak Republic, and rose to the rank of SS-Sturmbannführer.

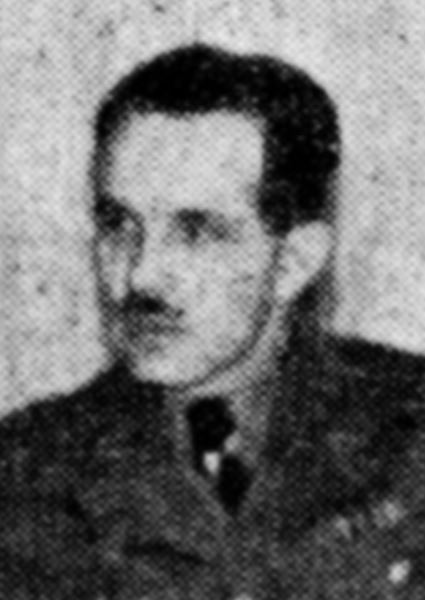
Franz Karmasin in 1941.

Tried in absentia and sentenced to death, he fled to West Germany where until his death he was active in the Witikobund, a right-wing extremist organization that claimed to represent Sudeten Germans.

== Youth ==
Karmasin was born on 2 September 1901 in Olomouc, a city formerly inhabited mostly by Germans, which only acquired a Czech majority after the fall of the Austro-Hungarian Empire in 1918. His father was a railway official from Brno. He attended the agricultural college in Děčín (1919–1923), and obtained an engineering degree. Karmasin did military service 1923–1924 at Hodonín and a military hospital in Olomouc. Between 1924 and 1926 he held different jobs in North Moravia and Bohemia.

== DKV organizer ==
In 1926 he moved to Slovakia, where he became increasing involved in organizational activities of the German community. Between April 1927 and 1930 he served as secretary of the (apolitical) German Cultural Union (Deutscher Kulturverband, DKV) and led the DKV Zips organization based in Kežmarok. Between 1930 and 1935 he worked as Gau Secretary of DKV in Slovakia, based in Bratislava.

== Political activities ==
Whilst he held posts in the apolitical DKV, Karmasin engaged in political activities on the side. In 1927 he was one of the co-founders of the Karpatendeutsche Volksgemeinschaft, which soon evolved into the Carpathian German Party (KdP). Karmasin became a member of the Sudeten German Kameradenschaftbund (KB) and acted as a liaison between the KdP and the Sudeten German Party (SdP). In 1934 he founded the weekly Deutsche Stimmen in Bratislava. However, as a DKV employee he could not hold any official leadership positions in KdP.

== Parliamentarian ==
Karmasin ended his role in DKV when he contested the 1935 Czechoslovak parliamentary election as a SdP candidate. He was elected to the Chamber of Deputies from the Jihlava 10th electoral district. Having entered the political life openly he was included in the national leadership of KdP. And with the merger of SdP and KdP in November 1935, Karmasin was named as Konrad Henlein's deputy for Slovakia and Ruthenia.

The SdP was banned in the midst of the Sudeten Crisis. In Slovakia the German Party (DP) was founded as a successor organization on 8 October 1938, under Karmasin's leadership. Karmasin was one of six former SdP deputies who kept their parliamentary seats on 30 October 1938, and he became a member of the Club of German National Socialist Deputies formed on 7 November 1938 (see German People's Group in Czecho-Slovakia).

Karmasin was elected to the Slovak parliament on 18 December 1938, as a candidate on the Slovak unity list.

== Slovak Republic ==
After World War II broke out and the Slovak Republic was formed, he was appointed state secretary for German affairs. In 1939 he spoke out against the Jews, arguing that one could not wait for the state to solve the problem of the anti-German enemies but that the people should take measures themselves. In 1940 he was appointed Führer of the German population in Slovakia. Karmasin is thought to have contributed to the deportation of Jews and to the "purification" of the German population, cleansing (in his words) it from "racially inferior and anti-social elements". During the Eichmann trial he was accused of having urged Eichmann to hasten the deportation of Jews, and Allied documentation contains a report from November 1939 in which Karmasin argued for the introduction of anti-Jewish legislation.

Karmasin was appointed SA-Brigadeführer (1941), then SS-Hauptsturmführer (1943), and finally SS-Sturmbannführer (1944).

== Post-war period ==
After the end of the war he was tried in absentia and sentenced to death by the Czechoslovak government. He fled to West Germany where he settled under the alias Franz Didak. He joined the Witikobund, an association of Sudeten Germans and served acting chairman of the organization. The Wikitobund continues to exist, on the extreme right wing of the Sudetendeutsche Landsmannschaft. Simultaneously he was a spy for Hungary.

He died in Steinebach am Wörthsee on 25 June 1970.

== See also ==
- SS-Heimatschutz Slowakei
