= Carpathian German Party =

Carpathian German Party Karpatendeutsche Partei
- Chairperson: Roland Steinacker (1928–1933); Desider Alexy (1933–1935); Franz Karmasin (1935–1938)
- Founded: July 1928
- Dissolved: 1938
- Preceded by: Karpatendeutsche Volksgemeinschaft
- Succeeded by: German Party
- Newspaper: Deutsche Stimmen (1934–1938)
- Ideology: German nationalism Christian democracy (1920s); Nazism (1930s)
- Political position: Centre-right (1920s); Far-right (1930s)
- National affiliation: German Electoral Coalition (1929); Sudeten German Party (1935–1938)
- Chamber of Deputies of Czechoslovakia (1935): 1 / 300
- Senate of Czechoslovakia (1935): 1 / 150

The Carpathian German Party (German: Karpatendeutsche Partei, abbreviated KdP) was a political party in Czechoslovakia, active amongst the Carpathian German minority of Slovakia and Subcarpathian Rus'. It began as a bourgeois centrist party, but after teaming up with the Sudeten German Party in 1933 it developed in a National Socialist orientation.

== Karpathendeutsche Volksgemeinschaft ==
The KdP originated in 1927 as the Karpathendeutsche Volksgemeinschaft (KDV, 'Carpathian German Ethnic Community'), founded by men like Dr. Roland Steinacker (a professor in Theology from Bratislava), the Sudeten German industrialist Karl Manouschek, Dr. Samuel Früwirt, Carl Eugen Schmidt (a Protestant pastor) and the engineer Franz Karmasin. The KDV was based mainly in Bratislava and surroundings, and gathered its members from the German bourgeoisie and sympathizers of various political parties (like the Farmers' League, the German National Party and the German Democratic Progressive Party). It also organized Sudeten Germans living in Slovakia.

== Party foundation ==
The KdP was constituted as a political party in July 1928 in Nálepkovo/Wagendrüssel, with their eyes on the upcoming parliamentary election. The KdP was chaired by Dr. Roland Steinacker until 1933.

The party had a Christian and anti-Marxist outlook, and positioned itself as a party loyal to the Czechoslovak state. A key concern of the founders of the KdP was to steer Germans in Slovakia away from Magyar-dominated parties. The new party hoped to break the political hegemony of the Zipser German Party. In terms of identity, the KdP put forward the notion of a 'Carpathian German' identity as opposed to the 'Zipser German' identity traditionally linked to the Hungarian monarchy.

== 1929 election ==
KdP contested the 1929 parliamentary election as part of the German Electoral Coalition, in alliance with the Farmers' League (BdL) and the German Labour and Economic Community (DAWG). Whilst the alliance won 16 seats in the Chamber of Deputies and nine seats in the Senate, no KdP candidates were elected. The alliance obtained 16,922 votes in the areas of the Carpathian Germans (Slovakia and Subcarpathian Rus').

== 1933–1934 ==
Desider Alexy became the KdP chairman in 1933. With the National Socialist seizure of power in Germany, KdP gradually moved closer to the Sudeten German Heimatsfront (which later evolved into the Sudeten German Party). The party founded the weekly newspaper Deutsche Stimmen ('German Voices') as its organ in 1934.

== 1935 election ==
In the 1935 parliamentary election KdP contested together with the Sudeten German Party. The agreement between the two parties was reached on March 28, 1935. One KdP candidate was elected, Siegmund Keil who contested a Senate seat in the Nové Zámky 11th electoral district. Moreover, Karmasin was elected to the Chamber of Deputies as a SdP candidate from the Jihlava 10th electoral district. In the Czechoslovak National Assembly SdP and KdP formed joint factions in the Chamber of Deputies and the Senate. All in all, KdP had polled around 30,000 votes (compared to a total number of around 150,000 Carpathian Germans). Effectively KdP did not become as dominant a force in the Carpathian German community that the SdP had done in the Sudetenland.

== Union with SdP ==
In November 1935 KdP entered into an organic union with SdP, in line with the Führer principle. The official name of SdP became the 'Sudeten German and Carpathian German Party' (Sudetendeutsche und Karpatendeutsche Partei). KdP organization was remodelled after that of SdP. Karmasin was named by SdP leader Konrad Henlein as his deputy for the Carpathian region. The symbol of KdP was modelled after that of the SdP, an elongated red shield which carried the letters "KdP".

As the alliance with the Sudeten German Party being cemented, KdP began to expand its reach among a younger generation of Germans in Slovakia. Many of the new adherents of KdP had returned from German-language technical schools in Bohemia and Moravia-Silesia or the German University in Prague. KdP was able to build a relatively strong presence in central Slovakia and managed to gain a role amongst younger generation in Zips as well. However the older generation of Zipser Germans and communists sympathizers remained sceptical of Karmasin and his party.

== Alliance with Magyar parties ==
Henlein visited Bratislava on April 27, 1936. During his visit he appealed to the leaders of the Magyar parties to form an alliance. Such an alliance, which became a reality in the 1937 local elections, meant that the United Magyar Party broke its links to the Zipser German Party. The Zipser German Party was routed in the 1937 polls.

== Banned ==
The KdP and SdP were banned by the Czechoslovak government in the midst of the Sudeten Crisis in September 1938. On 8 October 1938 the German Party was set up as a successor organization for the KdP. Karmasin would later become the Slovak Secretary of State for German Affairs and then a Waffen-SS Sturmbannführer.
