= German Party (Slovakia) =

German Party Deutsche Partei
- Volksgruppeführer: Franz Karmasin
- Founded: 8 October 1938
- Dissolved: 1945
- Preceded by: Carpathian German Party
- Newspaper: Grenzebote, Deutsche Stimmen
- Youth wing: German Youth
- Paramilitary wing: Freiwillige Schutzstaffel
- Labour wing: Arbeitsfront der Volksdeutschen in der Slowakei
- Membership (1940): 57,000 (claimed)
- Ideology: Nazism; Ethnonationalism; Germanophile
- Slovak Landtag (1938): 2 / 63

Party flag
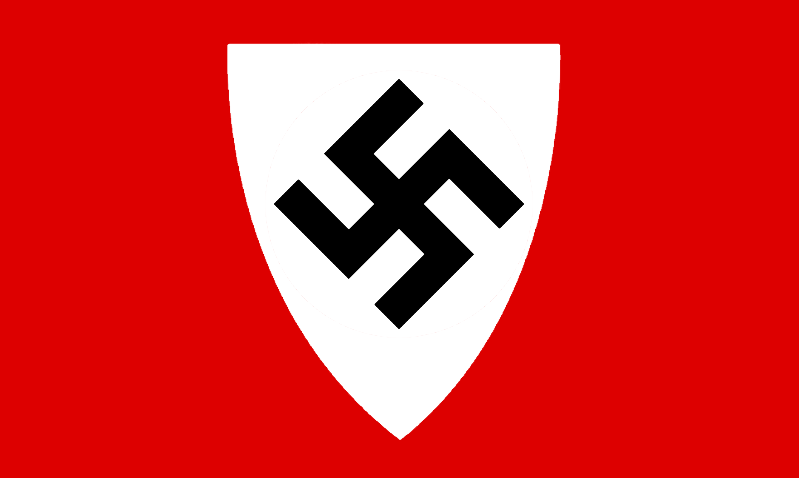

The German Party (German: Deutsche Partei, abbreviated DP) was a Nazi political party active amongst the German minority in Slovakia from 1938 to 1945.

== History ==
The party was formed on 8 October 1938 as a successor to the Carpathian German Party (KdP). Franz Karmasin, a member of the Czechoslovak Chamber of Deputies, led the party, holding the title of Volksgruppeführer. DP functioned as the referent in Slovakia for the German People's Group in Czecho-Slovakia (DVG), the successor organization of the Sudeten German Party founded on 30 October 1938. The party published Grenzbote and Deutschen Stimmen from Bratislava.

Organizationally, DP was modelled after the NSDAP in Germany, following the Führer principle. It used the swastika as its symbol and Horst-Wessel-Lied as its anthem. The DP youth wing was known as 'German Youth' (Deutsche Jugend) and maintained a paramilitary wing called Freiwillige Schutzstaffel. Politically DP strove to foster homogenous Carpathian German communities and to maintain a privileged position for the German community in Slovakia. The party was closely aligned with German foreign policy. The first article of the DP statutes, from 1 March 1940, proclaimed that "the German Party [was] representative of the political will of the entire German population in Slovakia". However, not all Germans in Slovakia were happy with the supposed unity party; DP faced resistance from followers of the pro-Hungarian Zipser German Party.

On 18 December 1938 the German Party got two deputies elected to the Slovak Landtag on the unity list of the Hlinka Slovak People's Party – Party of Slovak National Unity (HSĽS-SSNJ); Karmasin and Josef Steinhübl. In March 1940 the DP politician Sigmund Keil became a member of the Landtag, replacing Gejza Rehák. On 20 November 1941, a fourth DP politician became a Landtag member, as Dr. Adalbert Gabriel was appointed by presidential decree to represent the German community.

By 1940 DP claimed to have 57,000 members organized in 120 local groups. It folded in 1945.
