= Avgustyn Voloshyn =

Carpatho-Ukrainian politician and priest (1874–1945)

- Авґустин Волошин
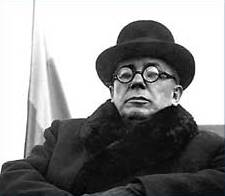

President of Carpatho-Ukraine
- In office March 15, 1939 – March 18, 1939
- Preceded by: post created
- Succeeded by: post dissolved

Personal details
- Born: March 17, 1874 Kelecsény, Austria-Hungary
- Died: July 19, 1945 (aged 71) Butyrka Prison, Moscow, Soviet Union
- Party: Ruthenian Peasants Party (1920–1924); Ukrainian National Union (1939)
- Other political affiliations: Christian People's Party (1924–1938); Ruthenian Agrarian Party (1920–1924)
- Awards: Hero of Ukraine

The Rt Rev. Avgustyn Ivanovych Monsignor Voloshyn (Ukrainian: Авґустин Волошин, Августин Волошин, Czech: Augustin Monsignore Vološin, 17 March 1874 – 19 July 1945), also known as Augustin Voloshyn, was a Carpatho-Ukrainian politician, teacher, essayist, and Greek Catholic priest of the Eparchy of Mukachevo in Czechoslovakia.

He was president of independent Carpatho-Ukraine (15–18 March 1939) during its existence.

== Early life and education ==
Avgustyn Voloshyn was born 17 March 1874 in Kelecsény, Carpathian Ruthenia, Austria-Hungary (now Kelechyn, Ukraine). The Voloshyn family were freed serfs, who in terms of social class were between the peasants and nobility. Augustyn's grandfather, Ivan, served as a Greek Catholic priest for the Greek Catholic Eparchy of Mukachevo in the village of Velyki Luchky starting in 1830. Avgustyn's father was also named Ivan, and he was also ordained a priest in 1867, which is when he moved to Kelecsény together with his wife Emilia Andriyivna Zombori. Emilia herself was also from a Greek Catholic priestly family. In addition to Avgustyn, Ivan and Emilia also had three other daughters: Olga, Olena, and Elenora.

His upbringing in the relatively rural village of Kelecsény would shape most of his development. The Voloshyn family was nationally conscious, as Ivan spoke almost exclusively in the Ukrainian language with his children, which was at the time considered a peasant's language, and it was he who helped instill a love for Ukraine and also a deep sense of Christianity.

After completing primary school, he started studying at the gymnasium in Uzhhorod in 1883. During the gymnasium entrance exam, he was placed into the preparatory class because he knew little of the Hungarian language. The gymnasium at the time, according to his fellow classmate Volodymyr Birchak, was heavily Magyarized, and the Ukrainian language was only taught in Church Slavonic as a voluntary subject. Nevertheless, the years there were positive to him, particularly because of Professor Vikentiy Zaimus, who taught the Latin language, and whom frequently argued that the Slavic people were an ancient and noble civilization. Voloshyn graduated in 1892 with a distinction on his matriculation exam, and was recommended by the Bishop of the Eparchy of Mukacheve, Yuliy Firtsak, to continue his studies at the Faculty of Theology at the emminent Pázmány Péter Catholic University.

He studied at the Ungvár (now Uzhhorod, Ukraine) School of Theology and at Budapest University.

== Career ==
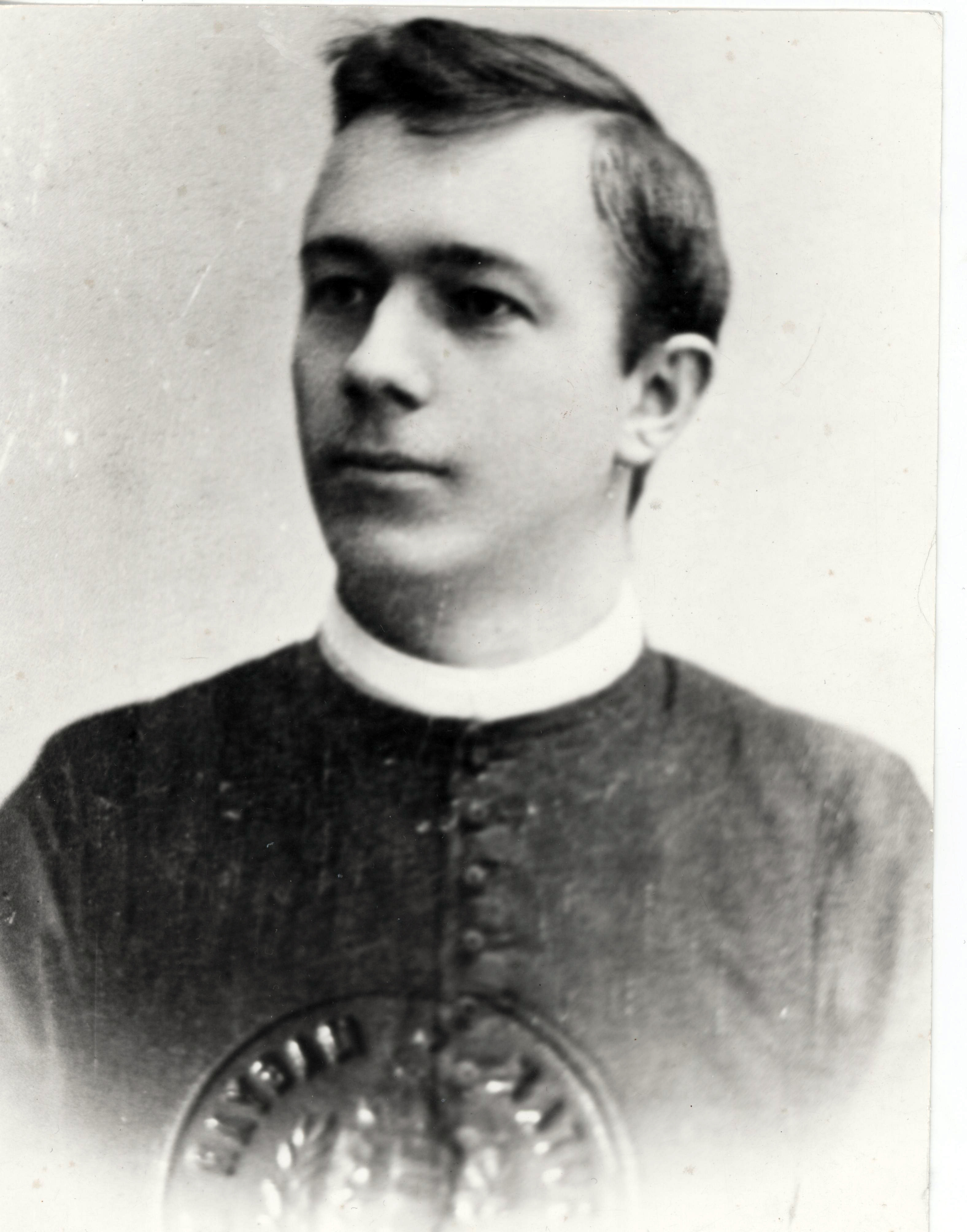
Voloshyn when he was a young priest

Voloshyn became a Greek Catholic priest and in 1924 was appointed a papal chamberlain (thus gaining the title of Monsignor). From 1900 to 1917 he was a professor of mathematics at Uzhhorod Teacher Institute.

In 1918 he became head of the Subcarpathian National Council, which in 1919 asked Czechoslovakia to confederate Carpathian Ruthenia into Czechoslovakia; this came about in autumn 1919. In 1925 he was elected an MP to Parliament in Prague, as leader of the Ruthenian National Christian Party.

On 26 October 1938 Czechoslovak President Emil Hácha named Voloshyn head of the government of the Subcarpathian Autonomous Region. Following the breakup of Czechoslovakia in March 1939, Voloshyn tried to proclaim Carpatho-Ukraine's independence and, with the help of local units of the Czechoslovak Army, on 15 March 1939 for a few hours became president of Carpatho-Ukraine. He proposed, to the Kingdom of Romania, Carpatho-Ukraine's unification with Romania, but the proposal was rejected and one day later the region was occupied by, and annexed to, Hungary. On 19 March 1939 Voloshyn, under the protection of the last Czechoslovak troops, retreated to the border of Romania, an ally of Czechoslovakia. Voloshyn then fled to Prague, where he lived during the war and was a professor at the Ukrainian Free University.

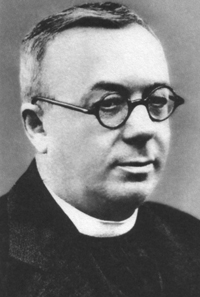
Voloshyn in his later years

In October and November 1944 the Soviet Red Army captured Carpathian Ruthenia, which was incorporated into the Ukrainian SSR. (The government of Czechoslovakia subsequently, on 29 June 1945, agreed to the territory's cession.) The population of Carpathian Ruthenia thus became Soviet citizens.

When the Soviet army took Prague in May 1945, Voloshyn was arrested by the NKVD and taken to Moscow. Though he had never been a Soviet citizen, he was accused of being a "Ukrainian nationalist and hostile to the Soviet Union." He died 19 July 1945 in Moscow's Butyrka prison; the official cause of death was given as heart failure.

The burial place is unknown, there are only two cenotaphs. One is located at the Olšany Cemetery in Prague together with his niece Olga Dutko and her husband, the other is in Uzhhorod, next to his wife's grave.

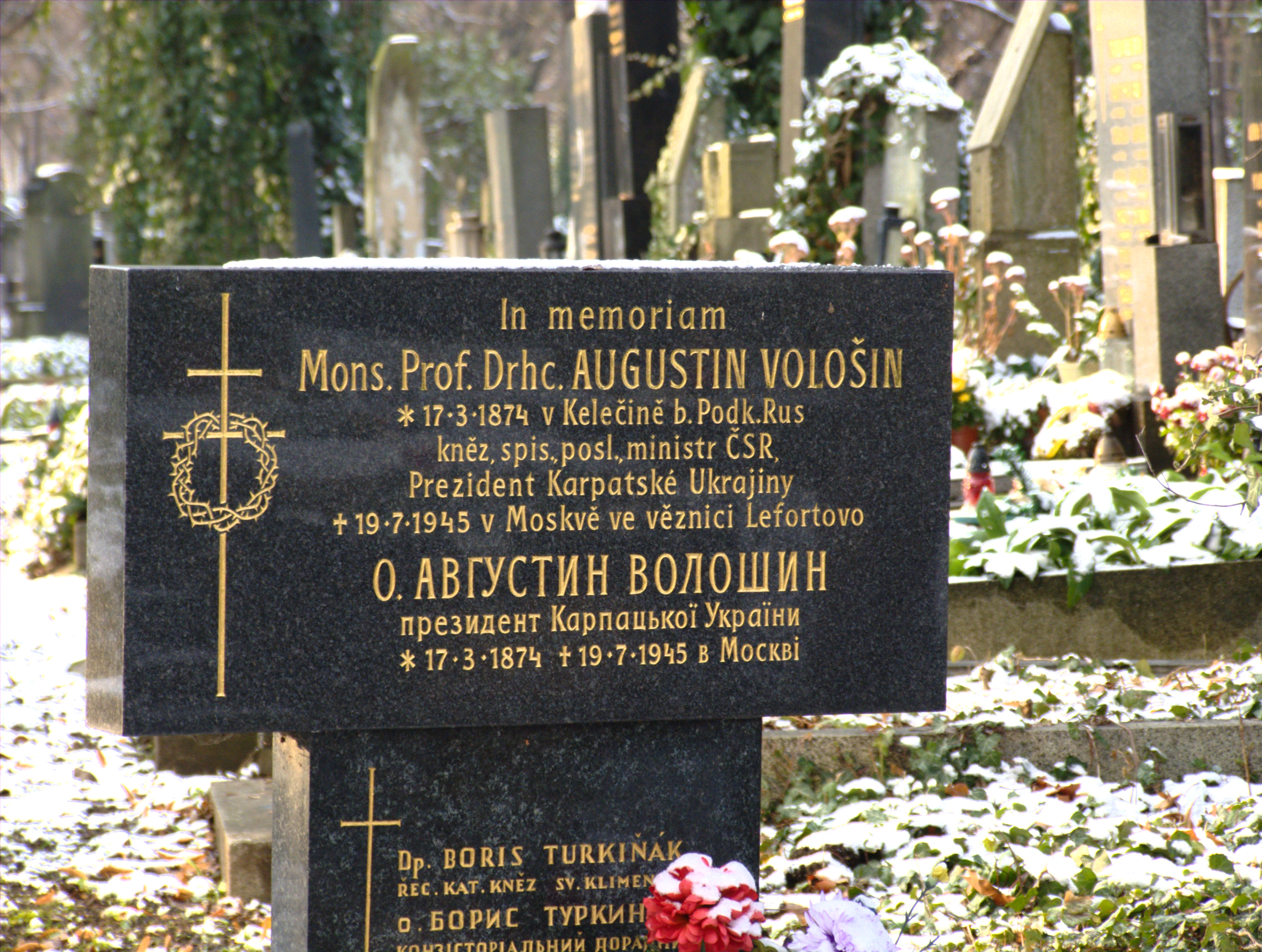
Voloshyn cenotaph at Olšany Cemetery

== Personal life ==
Voloshyn was married to Iryna Petryk. Petryk was the daughter of an Uzhhorod gymnasium professor. The couple had no children. In 1933 they decided to take care of orphans. They turned their own home into a family-type orphanage, where 22 orphans were raised.

== Legacy ==
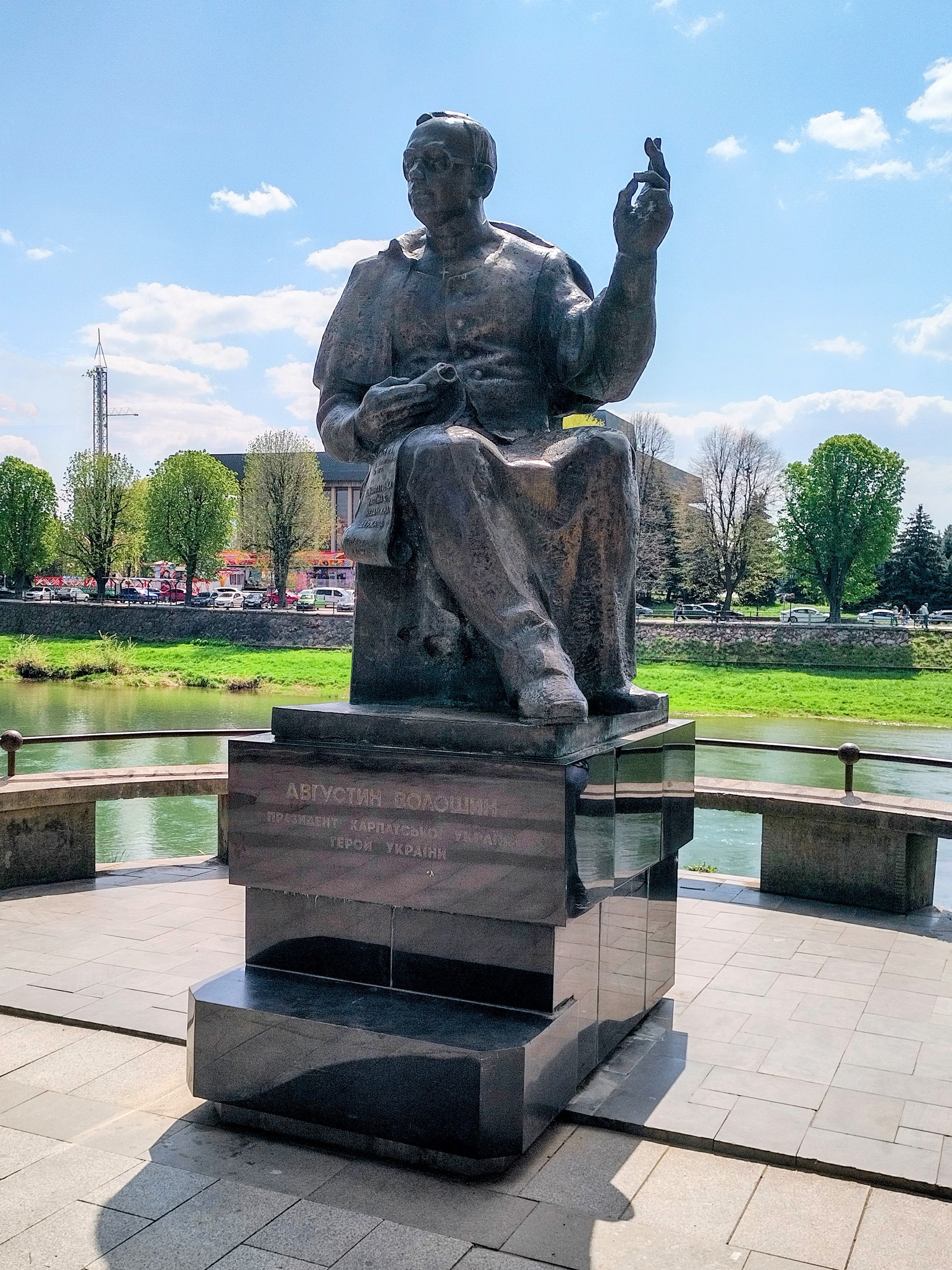
Statue of Avgustyn Voloshyn, "President of Carpathian Ukraine, Hero of Ukraine" in Uzhhorod

In 2002, by decree of then Ukrainian president Leonid Kuchma, Voloshyn was recognized as a Hero of Ukraine, with the civilian decoration of the Order of the State.

In 2004, a monument to Voloshyn was unveiled in Uzhhorod, and in 2006 in (his place of birth) Kelecsény.

In March 2021 Major Archbishop of Kyiv–Galicia and Primate of the Ukrainian Greek Catholic Church Sviatoslav Shevchuk consecrated the monument to Voloshyn in Kyiv, at Askold's Grave.

In 2024, as part of a decommunization campaign, the Yaroslav Halan Street in Kyiv was renamed Avgustyn Voloshyn Street. Streets named after Voloshyn are now in various cities of Ukraine: Dnipro, Lviv, Khmelnytskyi, Uzhhorod, Ivano-Frankivsk, Mukachevo and smaller towns and villages.

== See also ==
- Military history of Carpathian Ruthenia during World War II
- First Vienna Award
- Second Vienna Award
- Carpatho-Ukraine
