= Nitrianske Pravno =

- Municipality
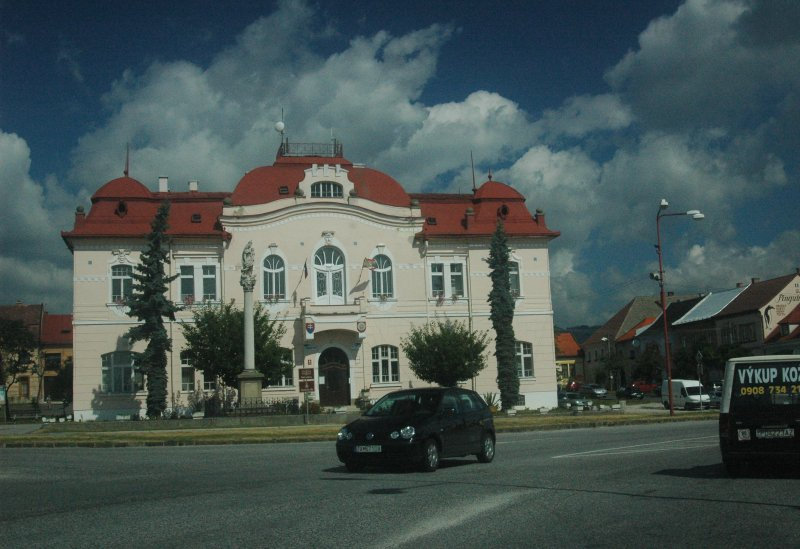
- Nitrianske Pravno

- Flag Coat of arms

- Location of Nitrianske Pravno in the Trenčín Region Location of Nitrianske Pravno in Slovakia
- Coordinates: 48.87°N 18.63°E
- Country: Slovakia
- Region: Trenčín Region
- District: Prievidza District
- First mentioned: 1393

Government
  - Mayor: Andrej Richter

Area
  - Total: 31.20 km^{2} (12.05 sq mi)
- Elevation: 354 m (1,161 ft)

Population (2025)
  - Total: 3,052
- Time zone: UTC+1 (CET)
  - Summer (DST): UTC+2 (CEST)
- Postal code: 972 13
- Area code: +421 46
- Vehicle registration plate (until 2022): PD
- Website: www.nitrianskepravno.sk

Nitrianske Pravno (pronounced [ˈɲitrɪɐnske ˈprawnɔ]; until 1946 Nemecké Pravno [ˈnemetskeː -], German: Deutschproben / Deutsch Pranno, Hungarian: Németpróna) is a village and municipality in Prievidza District in the Trenčín Region of western Slovakia.

== History ==
In historical records, the village was first mentioned in 1393. In 1430 it is mentioned as a small town belonging to the Bojnice Castle, with a gold mine nearby. It was prosperous in the 15th century, but as the 16th century came, it slowly began to decay, as the mines were exhausted and with many uprisings taking place at that time. It was degraded in 1886 from town status to large municipality status. The village belonged to a German language island. The German population was expelled in 1945.

== Geography ==
The municipality lies at an altitude of 354 metres (1,161 ft) and covers an area of 31.20 km^{2} (12.05 sq mi) (2025). The municipality lies in the upper Nitra River valley region, 12 km north of Prievidza.

== Population ==
Population statistic (10 years)
Year	1995	2005	2015	2025
Count	3070	3146	3218	3052
Difference		+2.47%	+2.28%	−5.15%

Population statistic
Year	2024	2025
Count	3077	3052
Difference		−0.81%

It has a population of 3052 people (31 December 2025).

=== Ethnicity ===
Census 2021 (1+ %)
Ethnicity	Number	Fraction
Slovak	2959	93.55%
Not found out	157	4.96%
German	95	3%
Total	3163	

In year 2021 was 3163 people by ethnicity 2959 as Slovak, 157 as Not found out, 95 as German, 22 as Czech, 19 as Other, 12 as Romani, 9 as Hungarian, 7 as Russian, 4 as Italian, 2 as Vietnamese, 2 as French, 2 as English, 1 as Ukrainian, 1 as Polish and 1 as Croatian.

Note on population: The difference values of population numbers in the table "Population statistic" and in the sections "Ethnicity" & "Religion" is caused by the use of various statistical methods.

=== Religion ===
Census 2021 (1+ %)
Religion	Number	Fraction
Roman Catholic Church	1771	55.99%
None	1075	33.99%
Not found out	158	5%
Evangelical Church	61	1.93%
Total	3163	

In year 2021 was 3163 people by religion 1771 from Roman Catholic Church, 1075 from None, 158 from Not found out, 61 from Evangelical Church, 26 from Greek Catholic Church, 14 from Christian Congregations in Slovakia, 12 from Other, 12 from Ad hoc movements, 6 from Other and not ascertained christian church, 6 from Jehovah's Witnesses, 5 from Islam, 4 from Paganism and natural spirituality, 3 from Eastern Orthodox Church, 3 from Baptists Church, 2 from Old Catholic Church, 2 from Calvinist Church, 2 from Buddhism and 1 from Seventh-day Adventist Church.
