= 1938 Slovak parliamentary election =

- 18 December 1938

All 63 seats in the Assembly of Slovakia
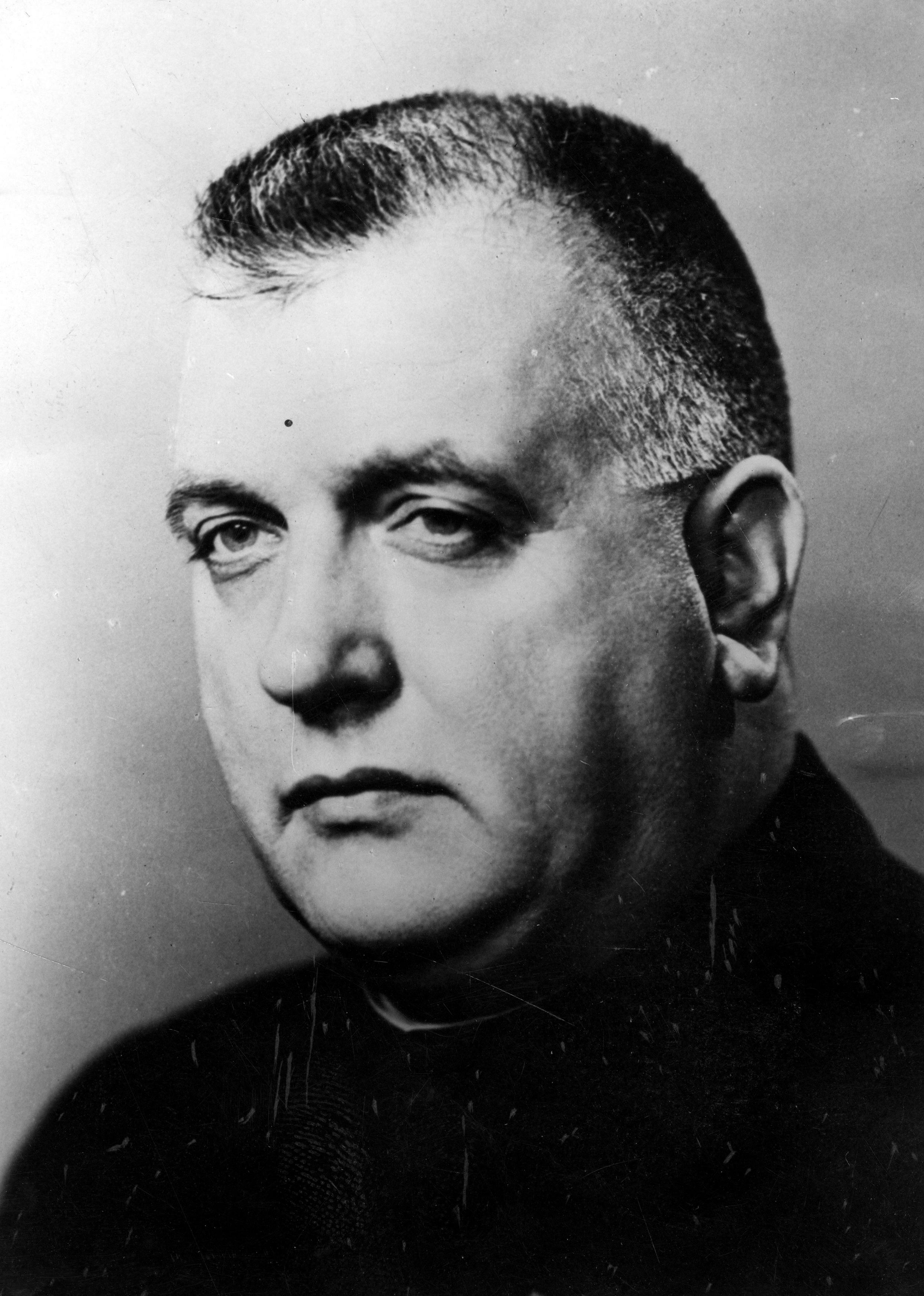
	First party
Leader	Jozef Tiso
Party	HSĽS–SSNJ
Alliance	United List
Seats won	47
Seat change	▲33
Percentage	97.5%
PM before election
Jozef Tiso
HSĽS–SSNJ
Elected PM
Jozef Tiso
HSĽS–SSNJ

Parliamentary elections were held in Slovakia on 18 December 1938 following the German annexation of the Sudetenland.

== Background ==
On 6 October 1938 Slovakia declared autonomy, (Note: The new status was confirmed on 22 November 1938, when the National Assembly passed a law granting Slovakia political autonomy) with Hlinka's Slovak People's Party (HSĽS) becoming the dominant political party in Slovakia. Some parties were partially forced to merge with HSĽS, whilst others were forbidden (Jewish parties, the Social Democratic Party and the Communist Party) or their activities were suspended (e.g. Slovak National Party which refused to "voluntarily" join HSĽS). New Hlinka's Slovak People's Party - The Party of Slovak National Unity (HSĽS-SSNJ) then organized rigged elections to strengthen its position in Slovakia and for further negotiations with the central government.

The elections were announced in the afternoon on Saturday 26 November 1938. Political parties were required to register by the next day, but the information was only officially published on Monday and in the daily press the following Thursday. The campaign contained strong anti-Czech and anti-Jewish propaganda, with those seeking to vote against labelled as traitors.

== Electoral system ==
The election took the form of a referendum, with voters asked only one question "Do you want a new, free Slovakia?" The elections were supervised by the Hlinka Guard, which had to find out how people voted. In many places, the government created separate polling stations for members of national minorities to trace their political preferences and "loyalty".

Voters were presented with a United List of 63 candidates.

== Results ==
Of the 63 members of the United List elected, 47 were members of Hlinka's Slovak People's Party, four were former members of the now-defunct Republican Party of Farmers and Peasants, two were members of the new German Party and one was a representative of the Hungarian minority.

Party or alliance		Votes	%	Seats
United List	Hlinka's Slovak People's Party – Party of Slovak National Unity		97.5	47
United List	German Party		97.5	2
United List	United Hungarian Party		97.5	1
United List	Independents		97.5	13
Against			2.5	–
Total				63
Source: Teich et al., Nižňanský

== Aftermath ==
Jozef Tiso used the results for the reconstruction of the autonomous government, thus weakening the influence of other former parties which "voluntarily" joined HSĽS. The first session of the new Diet of the Slovak Land was held on 18 January 1939, with Martin Sokol elected as its chairman and Jozef Tiso as Prime Minister. On 14 March the Diet accepted independence, following Tiso's explanation of his discussions with Adolf Hitler in which the latter had ordered the Slovak government to declare independence.
