= Carpatho-Ukraine =

Short-lived autonomous region and unrecognized state (1938–1939)

Carpatho-Ukraine Карпатська Україна
- 30 December 1938 – 15 March 1939
- Flag Coat of arms
- Anthem: Державний Гімн України; Derzhavnyi Himn Ukrainy "State Anthem of Ukraine"
- Status: Autonomous region of Czechoslovakia (1938–1939); Unrecognized state (1939)
- Capital and largest city: Khust
- Official languages: Ukrainian, Hungarian
- Government: Unicameral Republic (1938); Two-party state republic (1939) (Note: The Ukrainian National Union was established as the sole legal party alongside the German People's Council.)
- President
  - 1939: Avgustyn Voloshyn
- Prime Minister
  - 1938–1939: Avgustyn Voloshyn
  - 1939: Julian Revay
- Legislature: Soim
- Historical era: Interwar period
  - Autonomy: 22 November 1938
  - Proclaimed as Carpathian Ukraine: 30 December 1938
  - Proclamation of Independence: 15 March 1939
  - Abolished: 15 March 1939

Area
- 1939: 13,352 km^{2} (5,155 sq mi)

Population
  - 1939: 796,400
- Currency: Czechoslovak koruna
Preceded by	Succeeded by
Second Czechoslovak Republic	Hungary
- Today part of: Ukraine

Carpatho-Ukraine or Carpathian Ukraine (Ukrainian: Карпа́тська Украї́на, romanized: Karpatska Ukraina, IPA: [kɐrˈpɑtsʲkɐ ʊkrɐˈjinɐ]) was an autonomous region within the Second Czechoslovak Republic and short-lived state. It was created in December 1938 and renamed from Subcarpathian Rus', whose full administrative and political autonomy had been confirmed by constitutional law of 22 November 1938.

20 years earlier, by the 1920 Treaty of Trianon, the region, which had historically belonged to Hungary, had been detached from the Kingdom of Hungary and attached to newly created Czechoslovakia. Subsequently Hungary had sought revision of the Treaty of Trianon and the restoration of her historical borders.

On 2 November 1938 the First Vienna Award separated territories from Czechoslovakia, including southern Carpathian Rus', that were mostly Hungarian-populated and returned them to Hungary.

After the breakup of the Second Czechoslovak Republic, Carpatho-Ukraine on 15 March 1939 proclaimed itself an independent republic, headed by President Avgustyn Voloshyn.

However, Nazi Germany sided with Hungary against Ukrainian independence, and the short-lived state was invaded by the Kingdom of Hungary and Poland, crushing all local resistance by 18 March 1939. Subcarpathia remained under Hungarian control until the end of World War II in Europe, after which Transcarpathian Ukraine was occupied and annexed by the Soviet Union. The territory is now administered as the Ukrainian Zakarpattia Oblast.

== History ==
=== Political autonomy ===
Soon after the implementation of the Munich Agreement, signed on 30 September 1938, by which Czechoslovakia lost much of its border region to Nazi Germany, a series of political reforms were initiated, leading to the creation of a Second Czechoslovak Republic, comprising three autonomous political entities, including an autonomous Slovakia and an autonomous Subcarpathian Rus' (in the Rusyn language, Підкарпатьска Русь).

The first local government of autonomous Subcarpathian Rus', appointed on 11 October 1938, was headed by Prime Minister Andrej Bródy. There ensued a crisis involving two factions, pro-Rusyn and pro-Ukrainian, leading to the resignation of Bródy's government on 26 October. The new regional government, headed by Avgustyn Voloshyn, adopted a pro-Ukrainian orientation and changed the region's name from "Subcarpathian Rus'" to "Carpathian Ukraine".

On 22 November 1938 the Second Czechoslovak Republic adopted a "Constitutional Law on the Autonomy of Subcarpathian Rus'" (in the Czech language, Ústavní zákon o autonomii Podkarpatské Rusi), officially reaffirming the self-determination rights of the "Rusyn people" (preamble) and confirming the full administrative and political autonomy of Subcarpathian Rus', with its own assembly and government. This was seen as showing the central government's support for the pro-Rusyn faction.

On 30 December 1938 the regional government issued a provisional decree changing the region's name to "Carpathian Ukraine". That led to a peculiar terminological duality: in the Second Czechoslovak Republic's constitutional system, the region continued to be known as Subcarpathian Rus', whereas the region itself used the name "Carpathian Ukraine".

=== Political crisis ===
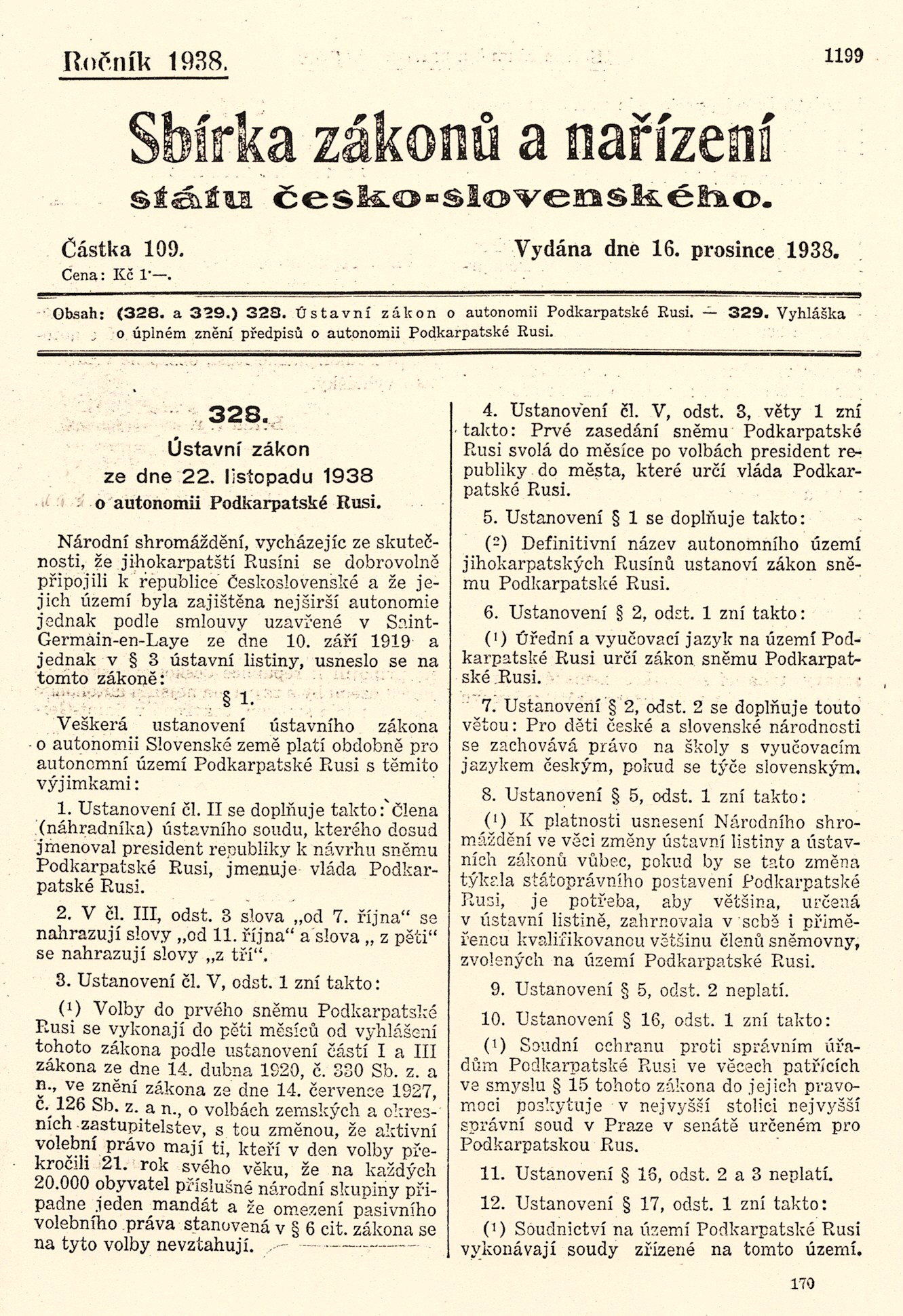
Constitutional Law on the Autonomy of Subcarpathian Rus' (1938)

In late September 1938, Hungary was ready to mobilize between 200,000 and 350,000 men on the Czechoslovak borders in case the Czechoslovak question could not be solved on diplomatic level, in favor of the Hungarian territorial claims. After the Munich Agreement the Hungarian Army had remained poised threateningly on the Czechoslovak border. They reportedly had artillery ammunition for only 36 hours of operations, and were clearly engaged in a bluff, but it was a bluff the Germans had encouraged, and one that they would have been obliged to support militarily if the much larger, better trained and better equipped Czechoslovak Army chose to fight. The Czechoslovak army had built 2,000 small concrete emplacements along the border in places where rivers did not serve as natural obstacles.

The Hungarian minister of the interior, Miklós Kozma, had been born in Subcarpathia, and in mid-1938 his ministry armed the Rongyos Gárda ('Ragged Guard'), which began to infiltrate guerrillas along the southern borders of Czechoslovakia, into Slovakia and Subcarpathia. The situation was now verging on open war, which might set the whole of Europe ablaze again. The appendix of the Munich Agreement stated that Czechoslovakia and Hungary should settle their disputes by mutual negotiation, which however failed to achieve agreement.

Between 25 October and 1 November 1938, Poland and Hungary conducted coordinated guerrilla operations in Carpathian Rus, with the objective of eliminating the sich (military camp) that had been established by the German-backed Organization of Ukrainian Nationalists outside the Rusyn capital, Uzhhorod. Poland had felt its southeastern Kresy threatened by the sich, while Hungary wished to regain Carpathian Rus, which Hungary had lost after World War I. Poland and Hungary hoped that the eventual restoration of their historic common boundary (which would indeed occur in March 1939) would satisfy the purposes of both countries.

The Hungarian and Czechoslovak governments accepted the German-and-Italian-brokered First Vienna Award, of 2 November 1938 (France and the United Kingdom having declined to participate in the negotiations).

The agreed border line returned 11,927 square km. to Hungary. A census in mid-December found 1,041,401 inhabitants in the reannexed territory, of whom 879,007 (84.4%) were Hungarians and 123,864 (11.9%) were Slovaks.

On 8 November 1938, the Slovak National Unity Party received 97.5 percent of the Slovak votes, and a one-party state was instituted. Slovak autonomy was formalized by the Prague parliament on 19 November, and to symbolize this new Slovak assertiveness, the country's name was then altered to Czecho-Slovakia. Carpatho-Ukraine was also given autonomy.

The Arbitration of Vienna fully satisfied nobody, and there followed 22 border clashes between 2 November 1938 and 12 January 1939, during which five Czechoslovaks were killed and six were wounded. The Slovak national militia Hlinka Guard participated in these clashes. The ineffectiveness of the Prague government in protecting their interests stirred Slovak and Ukrainian nationalism further. On 6 January 1939 Czechoslovak troops ordered by general Lev Prchala performed a surprise attack on the city of Munkács (now Mukacheve), in which the Carpathian Sich were as well involved, but the Rongyos Gárda with the help of the local police pushed them back. After this incident Döme Sztójay, the Hungarian ambassador in Berlin transferred a message to the German government in case of the German occupation of the Czech lands and the declaration of Slovak independence Hungary will occupy the rest of Carpathian Ruthenia, regardless of German approval. On March 11, the German ambassador in Budapest outlined in the German Government's response if Hungary will maintain and uphold the economic contracts with Germany, respect the rights of the local Germans and would not persecute the members of the Voloshyn Cabinet, then in case of the proclamation of an independent Carpatho-Ukraine would be acquiescent regarding the Hungarian plans.

=== Proclamation of Independence ===
Slovak and Ukrainian nationalism grew more intense. On 10 March, the Hlinka Guard and Volksdeutsche demonstrated, demanding independence from Czecho-Slovakia. In the evening of 13 March, Slovak leader Jozef Tiso and Ďurčanský met Adolf Hitler, Joachim von Ribbentrop, and Generals Walther von Brauchitsch and Wilhelm Keitel in Berlin.

Hitler made it absolutely clear: Slovakia could either declare independence immediately and associate itself with the Reich, or he would allow the Hungarians to take over the country – whom Ribbentrop reported were massing at the border. During the afternoon and night of 14 March, the Slovak parliament proclaimed independence from Czecho-Slovakia, and at 05:00 on 15 March 1939, Hitler declared the unrest in Czecho-Slovakia to be a threat to German national security. He sent his troops into Bohemia and Moravia, meeting virtually no resistance.

Following the Slovak proclamation of independence on March 14 and the Nazis' seizure of Czech lands on 15 March, Carpatho-Ukraine declared its independence as the Republic of Carpatho-Ukraine, with the Reverend Avgustyn Voloshyn as head of state.. Voloshin was now supported by the population of Subcarpathia. The First Constitutional Law of Carpatho-Ukraine of 15 March 1939 defined the new country as follows:

1. Carpatho-Ukraine is an independent state
2. The name of the state is: Carpatho-Ukraine
3. Carpatho-Ukraine is a republic, headed by a president elected by the Soim of Carpatho-Ukraine
4. The state language of Carpatho-Ukraine is the Ukrainian language
5. The colors of the national flag of the Carpatho-Ukraine are blue and yellow, blue on top and yellow on the bottom
6. The state emblem of Carpatho-Ukraine is as follows: a bear on a red field on the sinister side, four blue and three yellow stripes on the dexter side, as well as the trident of Saint Volodymyr the Great
7. The national anthem of Carpatho-Ukraine is "Ukraine has not perished"
8. This act comes valid immediately after its promulgation

The proclaimed Carpatho-Ukrainian government was headed by President Avgustyn Voloshyn, Prime Minister Julian Révaý, Minister of Defence Stepan Klochurak, and Minister of Internal Affairs Yuriy Perevuznyk. The head of the Soim was Avhustyn Shtephan, his deputies were Fedir Révaý and Stepan Rosokha. The Slovak declaration of independence caused law and order to break down immediately. The Hungarians had learned that the Germans would not object to a Hungarian takeover of Carpatho-Ukraine on the same day.

=== Hungarian invasion ===
The Chief of General Staff of Hungary Henrik Werth asked for at least a week to prepare for the invasion, but the Royal Council gave him only 12 hours to occupy Carpathian Ruthenia before the declaration of Slovak independence. Responsible for preparation to the assault was appointed chief of Munkacs garrison Lajos Béldi who commanded 1st Mountain Brigade, while Lieutenant General Ferenc Szombathelyi (commander of the 8th Corps in Kassa) was placed in charge of the Carpathian Group as an expeditionary force.

The available Hungarian forces consisted of an infantry regiment, two cavalry regiments, three infantry battalions on bicycles, one motorized battalion, two border guard battalions, one artillery battalion and two armored trains. These forces were counting for more than two World War II divisions. They were supported by Fiat CR.32 fighter aircraft amounting to one squadron. In addition to regular units, Hungarians were also aided by several irregular formations such as the Rongyos Gárda and black-shirt guards of István Fenczik, who has been accused earlier as a Magyaron by the Voloshyn Cabinet.

The Hungarian Border Guard units stationed around Munkács, after throwing back the attacking Czecho-Slovak units on 14 March 1939, pressed forward in turn, and took the town of Őrhegyalja (today Pidhoriany as part of Mukachevo).

On 15 March 1939, the Hungarian Army regular troops invaded Carpatho-Ukraine and by nightfall reached Szolyva. The Carpatho-Ukrainian irregular troops, the Carpathian Sich, without additional support, were quickly routed. The greatest battle between the Hungarian army and several hundred Ukrainian soldiers (armed with light machine guns, rifles, hand grenades and pistols) took place near Khust. About 230 Ukrainians died in the battle.

Czecho-Slovak resistance in Carpatho-Ukraine was negligible, and the advancing Hungarian troops did not have to face a well-organized and centralized resistance. The Hungarian Army also had the advantage of the First Vienna Award, which made it possible for the Hungarians to take possession of the area where the Czechs had built permanent fortifications to defend against Hungary.

On 16 March 1939, Hungary formally annexed the territory. Prime Minister Yulian Révaý had resisted the Hungarians until then. In the night to 17 March, the last Czecho-Slovak troops left Khust and retreated to Romanian borders. They and the one-day president of Carpatho-Ukraine, Voloshyn, fled to Romania.

The Royal Hungarian Army continued its advance and reached the Polish border on 17 March. Members of the Carpathian Sich from Galicia who were Polish citizens were captured by Hungarian forces and transported to Polish authorities for illegally crossing the border. Simultaneously, units of Border Protection Corps (KOP) of Poland were instructed by Marshal Edward Rydz-Śmigły to prevent any other armed Carpathian Sich members from entering Poland by shooting them or, upon surrender, disarming them and push them back to the Hungarian side. The last organized resistance in the Carpathian Mountains ended on 18 March.

Contemporary historical research indicate that some of the captured members of the Sicz were killed by Polish soldiers. The number of victims remains disputed. Although figures of 500 to 600 casualties are present in Ukrainian historiography, archival studies indicate these estimates rely on unverified testimonies rather than primary sources.. However, a study by historian Oleksandr Pahiria based mainly on Polish, Hungarian and Ukrainian archival materials points to documentary evidence confirming at least 43 victims in one of the Polish reports concerning the executions at the Veretskyi Pass. At the same time, the report itself is probably not an authentic document from that period, and the actual number of victims may have been higher. Archaeological excavations conducted by the "Dolia" memorial society between 2008 and 2011, recovered the remains of 17 individuals at sites near Verbiazh and Zhupany associated with the executions, but did not confirmed estimates of 500–600 victims.

The invasion campaign was a success, but it also proved that the Hungarian Army was not yet ready for full war. The handicaps imposed by the Trianon Treaty were clearly visible, but the morale and nationalist spirit of the soldiers and the civilian populations were high, which was also important in building a strong national army.

=== World War II and aftermath ===
Following the German occupation of Hungary in March 1944, Adolf Eichmann oversaw the deportation of almost the entire Hungarian Jewish population; few survived the Holocaust. At the conclusion of the Battle of the Dukla Pass on 28 October 1944, the Soviet Union had driven the Germans and Hungarians back and occupied Carpathian Ruthenia and the rest of western Ukraine. Control of Carpathian Ruthenia thus "nominally" reverted to Czechoslovakia. The delegation of the Czechoslovak government-in-exile, led by minister František Němec, arrived in Khust to establish the provisional Czechoslovak administration, according to the treaties between the Soviet and Czechoslovak government that year.

However, after just a few weeks, for reasons that remain unclear, the Red Army and the People's Commissariat for Internal Affairs started to obstruct the delegation's work and finally a puppet "National Committee of Transcarpatho-Ukraine" was set up in Mukachevo under the protection of the Red Army. On 26 November this committee, led by Ivan Ivanovich Turyanitsa, a Rusyn who had deserted from the Czechoslovak army, proclaimed the "will of Ukrainian people" to separate from Czechoslovakia and to join the Ukrainian Soviet Socialist Republic. After two months of conflict and unsuccessful negotiations the Czechoslovak government delegation departed Khust on 1 February 1945, leaving Carpatho-Ukraine under Soviet control.

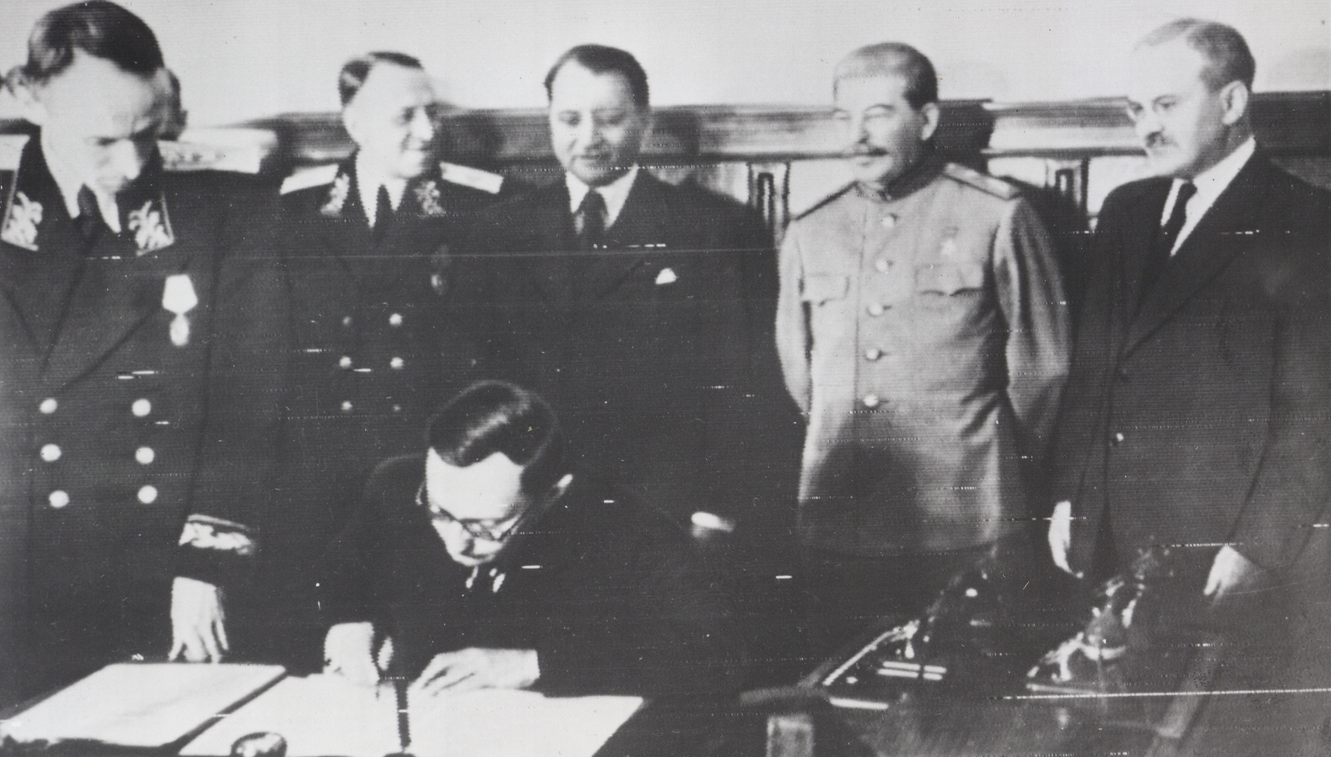
Zdenek Fierlinger signing a treaty with the soviets on Carpathian Ukraine

The Soviet Union exerted pressure on Czechoslovakia, and on 29 June 1945, the two countries signed a treaty, officially ceding Carpatho-Ruthenia to the USSR. In 1946, the area became part of the Ukrainian SSR as the Zakarpattia Oblast.

== Parliament ==
The Soim of Carpatho-Ukraine was established on 12 February 1939 by the Czechoslovak constitutional act of 22 November 1938. It consisted of 32 representatives with 29 Ukrainians and three of national minorities. There was only a single session of the parliament that took place on 15 March 1939 in Khust.

At the session the parliament approved the proclamation of the sovereignty of Carpatho-Ukraine, adopted its Constitution, elected the president, and confirmed the new government of Julian Révaý. The head of the Soim became Augustin Štefan with his deputies, Fedir Révaý and Stepan Rosokha. The presidium of the Soim emigrated out of the country following the invasion of Carpatho-Ukraine by the Hungarian Armed Forces.

== Prosecution of Carpatho-Ukraine activists and government officials ==
- Sevastian Sabol (1909–2003), a native of Priashiv (Prešov) and a surviving victim of Soviet and Hungarian prosecutions. During the Hungarian invasion of Carpatho-Ukraine in 1939, he was a chaplain in Carpathian Sich in Khust. On 16–18 December 1948, in Prague, Sabol was sentenced in absentia to life in prison for cooperation with the Ukrainian Insurgent Army.
- Avgustyn Voloshyn (1874–1945), died in a Soviet prison after being arrested in Prague by SMERSH in 1945.

== See also ==
- Slovak–Hungarian War
- Former countries in Europe after 1815
- Rusyns and Ukrainians in Czechoslovakia (1918–1938)

== Bibliography ==
- Ganzer, C. (2001). "Die Karpato-Ukraine 1938/39: Spielball im internationalen Interessenkonflikt am Vorabend des Zweiten Weltkrieges." (in German) Hamburg. Die Ostreihe - Neue Folge. (in German)
- Józef Kasparek, "Poland's 1938 Covert Operations in Ruthenia", East European Quarterly, vol. XXIII, no. 3 (September 1989), pp. 365–73.
- Kotowski, Albert S. (2001). Written at Freiburg. ""Ukrainisches Piemont"? Die Karpartenukraine am Vorabend des Zweiten Weltkrieges" ["Ukrainian Piedmont"? Carpathian Ukraine on the eve of the Second World War]. Jahrbücher für Geschichte Osteuropas (in German). 49. Stuttgart: Franz Steiner Verlag: 67–95. ISSN 0021-4019.
- Magocsi, Paul R. (1978). The Shaping of a National Identity: Subcarpathian Rus', 1848-1948. Cambridge: Harvard University Press. ISBN 9780674805798.
- Rosokha, S. (1949). Parliament of Carpatho-Ukraine. (in Ukrainian) Ukrainian National Publishing.
- Rychlík, Jan; Rychlíková, Magdaléna (2016). Podkarpatská Rus v dějinách Československa 1918–1946. Praha: Vyšehrad. ISBN 9788074297694.
- Shandor, V. (1997). Carpatho-Ukraine in the Twentieth Century: A Political and Legal History. Cambridge: Harvard University Press. ISBN 0-916458-86-5.
- Winch, M. (1939). Republic for a day: An eye-witness account of the Carpatho-Ukraine incident. London.
