= List of traffic collisions (2000–present) =

This list of traffic collisions records serious road traffic accidents, with multiple fatalities. The list includes notable accidents with at least 10 deaths, which either occurred in unusual circumstances, or have some other significance. For crashes that killed notable people, refer to the list of people who died in traffic collisions. This list records crashes from the year 2000. For earlier crashes, see list of traffic collisions (before 2000).

Notable traffic collisions
2000s:	2000	2001	2002	2003	2004	2005	2006	2007	2008	2009
2010s:	2010	2011	2012	2013	2014	2015	2016	2017	2018	2019
2020s:	2020	2021	2022	2023	2024	2025	2026	2027	2028	2029

== 2000s ==
=== 2000 ===
- January 2 – Peru – A vehicle fell into a ravine in Tutumbaro, killing 29.
- January 9 – Peru – A bus fell into the Mantaro River near La Oroya, killing 29 and injuring 23.
- January 12 – Brazil – A tourist bus collided with another bus in Santa Catarina, killing 42 and injuring 40.
- February 19 – Peru – A bus fell into the Carhuacayán river in Yauli province, killing 35 and injuring 15.
- March 2 – Peru – A bus plunged into a ravine near Ocros District, Huamanga, killing 30.
- March 29 – Kenya – Two buses collided and overturned near Kericho, killing 74 and injuring 58.
- July 7 – Spain – A bus collided head-on with a truck near Soria, killing 27 and injuring 13.
- August 28 – Nigeria – Abuja bus crash. A lorry crushed three buses after its brakes failed, rolling backwards into a crowded bus station, killing over 70. Related riots the next day killed four more.
- November 5 – Nigeria – Ibadan road tanker explosion. A petrol tanker ploughed into a traffic jam and exploded, killing around 200.
- November 13 – Peru – A truck overturned on the Puno-Arequipa highway, killing 27.
- December 25 – Philippines – A bus was rear-ended and pushed off a 13-meter embankment by another bus in Bansalan, killing 38.

=== 2001 ===
- January 27 – Australia – Gerogery level crossing accident. A car was struck by an XPT service traveling at 160 km/h (99 mph), killing five.
- February 12 – Peru – A bus collided with a truck on the Pan-American Highway near Casma, killing 20.
- February 16 – Peru – A bus fell into a ravine in Puno Department, killing 20 and injuring 23.
- February 28 – United Kingdom – Selby rail crash. A car was driven off the M62 motorway onto railway tracks, causing the derailment of a passenger train and its subsequent collision with a freight train; the latter killed 10 and injured 82.
- March 4 – Portugal – Hintze Ribeiro Bridge collapse. A bridge across the Douro river collapsed as a bus and three cars were crossing, killing 59.
- March 16 – Sudan – A bus collided with a fuel truck in Kosti, killing 21 and injuring 50.
- March 19 – Philippines – A diesel tanker crashed into five vehicles before catching fire in Parañaque, killing 14 and injuring three.
- March 19 – Philippines – A truck collided with a bus along the North Luzon Expressway in Bocaue, killing 12 and injuring 12.
- April 1 – Peru – A bus fell from a bridge in Huamanga province, killing 18 and injuring 46.
- June 25 – Tanzania – A truck overturned near Sumbawanga, killing 25 and injuring 30.
- August 1 – India – A jeep collided head-on with a bus in Rajasthan, killing 13 and injuring 15.
- October 26 – Philippines – A bus hit a crowded house in Buenavista, Agusan del Norte, killing 21 and injuring six.
- November 18 – Peru – A bus plunged off a ravine near Yanahuanca, killing 24 and injuring 19.

=== 2002 ===
- February 2 – Philippines – A bus plunged off a ravine in Bokod, Benguet, killing 12.
- February 16 – Peru – A bus overturned on the Ilo-Desaguadero highway, near Mazocruz, killing 22 and injuring 28.
- March 13 – Peru – A bus overturned after crashing into a gas station in Chincha, Ica Department, killing 33 and injuring 17.
- April 12 – India – A van carrying Hindu pilgrims crashed into a truck in Calcutta, killing 21 and injuring 17.
- April 26 – Philippines – A jeepney collided with a bus in Bambang, Nueva Vizcaya, killing 11 and injuring six.
- May 26 – United States – I-40 bridge disaster. A barge collided with a bridge support in Oklahoma, causing a 580 ft (180 m) section of the bridge to plunge into the Arkansas River, killing 14 and injuring 11.
- May 27 – Peru – A truck crashed into three houses in Tacna, killing 29 and injuring 11.
- July 1 – Hungary – A bus carrying Polish pilgrims slid off a road and overturned near Balatonszentgyorgy, killing 19 and injuring 32.
- August 10 – Philippines – A van collided with a speeding truck in Liloy, killing 11 and injuring two.
- September 2 – Bolivia – A bus carrying more than 45 passengers slid off a road and plunged 170 meters down a ravine near La Paz, killing 25.
- September 15 – Argentina – A bus plunged into a ravine in Catamarca Province, killing 47 and injuring 26.
- November 6 – Egypt – A tourist bus carrying 50 people slammed into a truck loaded with rocks between Cairo and Sharm el-Sheikh, killing 27 and injuring 24.
- November 24 – Philippines – A bus fell into a creek in Tagkawayan, killing 33 and injuring six.

=== 2003 ===
- January 28 – India – A tourist bus collided head-on with a truck in West Bengal, killing 42.
- April 13 – Greece – Tempi road accident disaster. An intercity bus carrying 49 students and three accompanying teachers returning from a school trip to Athens collided head-on with a truck in Tempi, killing 21 and injuring 32.
- April 27 – Philippines – A jeep hit an oncoming bus on a mountain road in Tagkawayan, causing the bus to plunge into a ravine, killing 11 and injuring 31.
- May 1 – South Africa – Sol Plaatje Dam bus crash. A coach drove into the Sol Plaatje Dam at night, killing 51.
- June 4 – India – Kasganj level crossing disaster. A bus was hit by a train on an open level crossing in Kasganj, killing 49 and injuring 29.
- July 10 – Hong Kong – Tuen Mun Road bus accident. A bus plunged off a bridge following a collision with a lorry, killing 21.
- July 16 – United States – Santa Monica Farmers Market crash. An elderly man drove into a farmers' market after hitting another car, killing 10 and injuring 70.
- September 22 – Philippines – A bus collided with another bus and a van before plunging into a ravine in Gattaran, killing 14.
- September 27 – Philippines – A minibus hit a waiting shed in Mariveles, killing 14.
- October 8 – Indonesia – East Java bus crash. A truck collided with a bus head-on near Situbondo, then another truck collided with the rear of the bus which caught fire, killing 54. It was the deadliest road accident in Indonesia's history.
- October 10 – Peru – A bus plunged into the Vizcarra River, killing 40.
- October 21 – Pakistan – A bus skidded off a bridge and fell into a ditch in Abbottabad, killing 20 and injuring 35.
- November 15 – Philippines – A jeepney rammed a truck in Silay, killing 15.
- December 16 – Peru – A bus fell into a ravine near Cerro de Pasco, killing 27.

=== 2004 ===
- January 31 – Philippines – Two buses collided in Botolan, killing 10.
- March 19 – Finland – Konginkangas bus disaster. The trailer of a truck swerved into a bus, killing 23 and injuring 14.
- April 11 – United Kingdom – Ingoldmells bus crash. A double-decker bus collided with pedestrians in Ingoldmells, killing five.
- May 4 – Burkina Faso – A fuel truck collided with a bus and caught fire in Niangoloko, killing 35.
- May 24 – Romania – Mihăilești explosion. A truck loaded with ammonium nitrate rolled over and caught fire before exploding, killing 18 and injuring 13.
- June 16 – Pakistan – A bus collided with a truck and plunged from the Kak Pul in Islamabad, killing 40 and injuring 10.
- July 9 – Peru – Two buses collided on the Pan-American Highway near Palpa District due to thick fog, killing 37.
- August 1 – Peru – A bus plunged into a ravine in Ancash, killing 32 and injuring 15.
- August 18 – Iran – Zahedan bus crash. A bus collided with a truck, killing 15 and injuring 20.
- October 9 – United States – A tour bus plunged off Interstate 55 in Arkansas, killing 15.
- November 6 – United Kingdom – Ufton Nervet rail crash. A train hit a car and derailed, killing seven and injuring 71.

=== 2005 ===
- January 10 – India – A bus fell into a canal in Bijapur district, Karnataka, killing 51.
- February 3 – India – Nagpur level crossing disaster. A crowded trailer being towed by a tractor was hit by a train, killing 55.
- April 2 – Philippines – A bus collided with a jeepney in San Fabian, Pangasinan, killing 18.
- April 8 – Zambia – A truck carrying students overturned while descending a hill in Kawambwa, killing 44.
- April 27 – Sri Lanka – Polgahawela level crossing accident. A bus was hit by train, killing 41.
- May 7 – Peru – A bus fell off a cliff in Corongo province, killing 40 and injuring 18.
- May 15 – Vietnam – A bus fell 150 m (490 ft) down ravine after colliding with a motorcycle in Tam Đường, killing 19.
- May 21 – Peru – A bus fell into the Mantaro River near Jauja, killing 37 and injuring 24.
- May 22 – Philippines – A bus slammed into a roadside boulder in Tuba, Benguet, killing 27.
- June 7 – Nepal – Badarmude bus explosion. A bus struck a land mine, killing 38.
- September 30 – Poland – A bus carrying high school students collided with a truck and burst into flames in Białystok, killing 12.
- October 15 – Peru – A bus fell into the Mantaro River in Izcuchaca, killing 30 .
- November 24 – Peru – A bus fell into the Rimac River in Huarochirí province, killing 22 and injuring 20.

=== 2006 ===
- January 20 – India – An overcrowded bus plunged into a gorge in Rajouri, killing 52 and injuring 15.
- February 13 – Peru – A bus crashed into a mountain near Tintay District, killing 28 and injuring 50.
- February 17 – Canada – White-out conditions caused a 38-vehicle pileup in Embrun, Ontario, killing five.
- February 18 – Australia – Cardross road crash. A car hit a group of pedestrians in Cardross, Victoria, killing six.
- February 27 – Peru – A bus plunged into a ravine in Arequipa Department, killing 26 and injuring 12
- March 9 – Turkey – A bus carrying about 40 people drove off a road and plunged into the Kelkit River in Tokat Province, killing 16 and injuring 11.
- April 17 – Mexico – A bus crashed about 650 ft (200 m) down a ravine and into a stream in Veracruz, killing 57.
- May 11 – Philippines – A van collided with a bus in Panabo, killing 11.
- June 23 – Egypt – Sinai bus crash. A bus overturned and landed upside down between Nuweiba and Taba, killing 12.
- July 5 – Kazakhstan – A bus collided with a truck in Shetskiy district, killing 15.
- September 30 – Canada – De la Concorde overpass collapse. A 65 ft (20 m) section of a 3-lane overpass over Autoroute 19 collapsed, killing five and injuring six.
- October 26 – Peru – A bus plunged into a ravine in Vitor District, killing 24.
- October 28 – Philippines – A dump truck lost its brakes at a downhill curve and crashed into several vehicles and villagers celebrating a religious feast in Makilala, killing 18.
- November 13 – South Africa – Faure level crossing accident. A truck carrying workers was hit by a train, killing 19 and injuring six.
- December 5 – Peru – A bus traveling plunged into a ravine near Ollachea, killing 45.
- December 13 – Peru – A truck and a bus collided in Bagua province, killing 26.

=== 2007 ===
- January 6 – Bangladesh – Comilla bus crash. A bus crashed and caught fire, killing 65.
- January 25 – Mexico – A bus fell off a ravine near Huautla de Jiménez, killing 33.
- February 2 – Philippines – A burning chemical truck exploded as a bus was passing beside it in Tigbao, Zamboanga del Sur, killing 50.
- May 11 – India – A bus skidded off a bridge and fell into the Ganges river in Bihar, killing 20.
- May 11 – India – A jeep collided with an oil tanker in Mayurbhanj, killing 11 and injuring four.
- June 5 – Australia – Kerang train accident. A train collided with a truck at the junction of the Murray Valley Highway and the Piangil railway line near Kerang, killing 11.
- July 1 – Peru – A bus collided with a truck on the Pan-American Highway in La Libertad Department, killing 24.
- July 17 – Republic of the Congo – A packed truck overturned near Pointe-Noire, killing 18.
- July 22 – Philippines – A truck collided with a motorcycle in Calbayog, killing 13 and injuring 30.
- July 22 – France – Rampe de Laffrey accident. A bus drove off the road and into a ravine near Vizille, killing 26 and injuring 24.
- August 1 – United States – I-35W Mississippi River Bridge collapse. The structure and deck of a bridge collapsed into the Mississippi River and onto the riverbanks, killing 13.
- August 13 – Malaysia – A bus crashed into a ditch on the North–South Expressway in Bukit Gantang, killing 20.
- October 16 – Peru – A bus plunged into a ravine near La Oroya, killing 22.
- November 4 – Azerbaijan – Baku–Gazakh motorway minibus crash. A minibus carrying 20 people hit a parked truck, killing 14 and injuring four.

=== 2008 ===
- January 29 – Philippines – A van collided head-on with a truck in Carmen, Cotabato, killing 14 and injuring 20.
- February 29 – Nigeria – A bus rolled over and plunged into a ditch along the Gusau-Funtua highway in Zamfara State when a front tyre burst, killing 11.
- February 29 – Guatemala – Villa Canales bus disaster. A bus crashed into a 10-meter ravine after missing a sharp bend, killing 54 and injuring 25.
- April 11 – Libya – A bus collided head-on with a car near Tripoli, killing 36 and injuring nine.
- April 16 – India – A bus veered off a bridge and plunged into a canal in Vadodara, killing 47, including 44 children.
- April 19 – Spain – Benalmádena coach crash. An SUV collided with a bus full of tourists while trying to overtake it, killing nine and injuring 38.
- May 1 – Hong Kong – Sai Kung bus crash. A tour bus flipped onto its side on Hiram's Highway in Sai Kung District, killing 19 and injuring 43.
- May 7 – Peru – A bus plunged into the Cañete River in Yauyos, killing 32.
- May 8 – India – A bus skidded off a road and fell into the Chenab River in Kashmir, killing 15.
- July 9 – Bolivia – A bus plunged off a cliff in Potosí Department, killing 47.
- July 21 – Peru – Three buses collided on the Pan-American Highway in Pasamayo, Lima Department; killing 22 and injuring 69.
- July 29 – Philippines – Two buses collided head-on in Pamplona, Camarines Sur, killing 13 and injuring 30.
- August 8 – United States – Sherman, Texas bus accident. A bus drove off an overpass bridge of Route 75, killing 17.
- August 27 – Philippines – A van carrying South Korean tourists crashed into a concrete wall in Bolinao, killing 10.
- September 13 – China – A bus crashes into a 100 m gorge in Sichuan, killing 51.
- September 21 – Kazakhstan – A truck crashed into a minibus on the highway from Almaty to Ust-Kamenogorsk, killing 12 and injuring one.
- October 21 – United Kingdom – M6 motorway crash. Three lorries and two cars collided on the M6 motorway near Sandbach, killing six, including three children and an infant.
- November 15 – Burkina Faso – Burkina Faso bus crash. A truck carrying 80 people collided with a bus on National Highway 1 in Boromo before catching fire, killing 66.
- December 14 – Egypt – A bus plunged into an irrigation ditch in Dahrut, killing 55 and injuring 10.
- December 16 – Israel – Israeli tour bus crash. A bus rolled down a ravine between Ovda and Eilat, killing 25 and injuring 30 in the deadliest traffic accident in Israel's history.

=== 2009 ===
- January 10 – Peru – A bus fell into a ravine in Querocoto District, killing 34.
- February 21 – Slovakia – Brezno train accident. A train collided with a tourist coach on a level crossing, killing 12 and injuring 20.
- March 28 – Philippines – A bus collided with a 10-wheeler hauler truck in Naga, Cebu, killing 14.
- May 28 – Bulgaria – Yambol bus crash. A bus crashed into a group of pedestrians, killing 18 and injuring 20.
- July 2 – Peru – A collision between two buses on the Arequipa-Juliaca highway killed 27 and injured 28.
- July 24 – Russia – Rostov-on-Don bus crash. A bus collided with a petrol tanker, killing 21.
- July 26 – United States – Taconic State Parkway crash. A minivan collided head-on with an SUV on the Taconic State Parkway, killing eight and injuring three.
- July 27 – Tanzania – A bus collided with a lorry after bursting a tire in Korogwe, killing 28.
- July 30 – Spain – Sant Pol de Mar bus crash. A double-decker bus carrying Dutch tourists left the highway on a bend and hit a car and a metal crash barrier before overturning, killing six and injuring 36.
- July 31 – Peru – A bus collided with a gasoline tanker truck near San Vicente de Cañete, killing 20.
- August 14 – Romania – Scânteia train accident. A bus collided with a train on County Road 248C, killing 14.
- September 19 – China – A maintenance vehicle was rear-ended by a truck and plunged off a viaduct in Nanchang, killing 16.
- October 8 – Philippines – A multicab and a truck collided in Nabunturan, killing 11 and injuring seven.
- October 28 – Philippines – A bus fell into an 80-foot ravine after colliding with two other vehicles on a bridge in Cauayan, Isabela, killing 10 and injuring 21.
- October 31 – Kenya – A bus rolled over in Modagashe, killing 15 and injuring 16.
- November 2 – Iran – A bus carrying pilgrims on their way to holy sites in Iraq crashed into a warehouse near Ilam, killing 28.
- November 2 – Peru – Two buses and a truck collided in Arequipa, killing 14 and injuring 40.
- December 24 – Peru – Espinar bus crash. A bus rolled over the edge of a cliff, killing 41 and injuring 22.

== 2010s ==
=== 2010 ===
- January 14 – Papua New Guinea – A bus and a truck used for public transportation crashed head-on in Morobe Province, killing 40.
- February 8 – Afghanistan – Salang avalanches. At least 36 avalanches struck the southern approach to the Salang Tunnel, killing 175.
- February 13 – Nigeria – Port Harcourt bus electrocution. A power line broke, striking two buses and electrocuting the occupants, killing 11.
- February 15 – Philippines – A jeepney and a trailer truck collided in Piat, Cagayan, killing 14 and injuring 13.
- February 17 – India – A bus plunged into the Yamuna River in Jalaun, killing 22.
- February 22 – Peru – Two buses collided head-on on the Panamerican Highway, killing 38 and injuring 58.
- March 7 – Philippines – A bus lost its brakes before slamming into a tree in Pugo, La Union, killing 12.
- June 13 – Philippines – Balamban bus accident. A bus fell off a 30 ft (9.1 m) ravine in Balamban, killing 21.
- July 2 – Democratic Republic of Congo – South Kivu fuel tank explosion. A fuel tanker overturned and exploded, creating a fireball that devastated the town of Sange, killing 230 and injuring 196 in the deadliest road accident in history.
- July 3 – Philippines – A bus lost its brakes and hit a concrete wall in Toledo, Cebu, killing 15.
- July 11 – Ireland – R238 traffic collision. Two cars collided on the R238 road in Inishowen, killing eight in Ireland's deadliest road accident.
- August 18 – Philippines – A bus lost its brakes before falling into a 30 m (98 ft) ravine in Sablan, killing 41.
- September 26 – Germany – A coach carrying Polish tourists crashed after being forced off the road by a car joining the A10 motorway in Schönefelder Kreuz, killing 13 and injuring 39.
- October 10 – Malaysia – North–South Expressway crash. Two buses, three cars and a van crashed along the North–South Expressway, killing 12 and injuring 50.
- October 12 – Ukraine – Marhanets train accident. A bus ran a red light at a railroad crossing and was hit by a train, killing 43 and injuring nine.
- October 12 – Poland – A lorry and a minibus collided near Nowe Miasto nad Pilica, killing 18.
- December 1 – Nigeria – Alakija tanker explosion. A fuel tanker crashed and exploded, destroying nearby structures as well as two buses and two cars, killing 20.
- December 20 – Malaysia – Cameron Highlands bus crash. A double-decker bus crashed on the Second East–West Highway, killing 27.
- December 25 – India – A bus collided with a van carrying mourners in Badaun, killing 35 and injuring 14.

=== 2011 ===
- January 6 – India – A bus fell into a gorge near Dehradun, killing 22 and injuring 19.
- February 25 – Peru – A bus fell into a ravine east of Lima, killing 22 and injuring 39.
- March 2 – India – A truck fell into a gorge near Shekhpur, Himachal Pradesh, killing 32 and injuring six.
- March 12 – United States – World Wide Tours bus crash. A bus crashed on Interstate 95, killing 15.
- May 18 – Tanzania – Two buses collided in Mwanza Province, killing 15 and injuring 58.
- May 31 – India – A bus carrying wedding guests skidded off a wooden bridge and fell into a pond in Hajo, killing 31.
- May 31 – Peru – A bus overturned on the Pisco-Ayacucho highway near Vinchos, killing 21 and injuring 30.
- June 6 – Pakistan – A minibus slid off a mountainous road and plunged into a ravine near Chaman, killing 14 and injuring 10.
- July 7 – India – A train collided with a bus on an unmanned crossing in Kanshiramnagar, killing 38 and injuring 31.
- July 11 – Bangladesh – Mirsarai Tragedy. A pick-up truck carrying mostly students veered off the road and plunged into a ditch, killing 45 including 43 children.
- July 22 – China – Xinyang bus fire. A bus caught fire along National Highway 105, killing 41 and injuring six.
- August 5 – Ivory Coast – A bus veered off a bridge in Abidjan and plunged into the lagoon below, killing 37.
- August 20 – Kenya – A minibus lost control, hit a barrier of a bridge and rolled over rocks near Nairobi, killing 23.
- August 20 – Afghanistan – A bus overturned in Daman, killing 35 and injuring 24.
- August 25 – Zimbabwe – A haulage truck collided with a bus along the Harare-Bulawayo highway, killing 19 and injuring 20.
- September 27 – Pakistan – Kallar Kahar school bus accident. A school bus fell into a ravine on the M-2 motorway, killing 37 and injuring 70.
- October 13 – Nepal – A bus fell off a cliff into the Sunkoshi River in Sindhuli District, killing 41 and injuring 16.
- November 4 – United Kingdom – M5 motorway crash. 34 vehicles collided near Taunton on the M5 motorway, killing seven and injuring 51.
- November 13 – Pakistan – A van collided head-on with a bus near Thatta, killing 23.
- November 16 – China – Gansu school bus crash. A school bus collided head-on with a coal truck, killing 21.
- December 1 – Philippines – A van slammed into a parked truck in Malungon, killing 13 and injuring five.
- December 3 – Brazil – A truck and a bus collided near Milagro, Bahia, killing 33 and injuring 13.
- December 13 – China – A school bus fell into an irrigation canal in Jiangsu province, killing 15 and injuring eight.
- December 30 – Venezuela – An oil truck crashed on a busy road in Caracas and caught fire, killing 13 and injuring 16.

=== 2012 ===
- February 6 – Canada – Hampstead crash. A van carrying Peruvian migrant workers collided with a flatbed truck in Hampstead, killing 11.
- March 4 – Guinea – A lorry travelling from Moribadou to Beyla plunged into a ravine, killing 50 and injuring 27.
- March 13 – Switzerland – Sierre coach crash. A coach carrying 52 teachers and students crashed into a wall in the Sierre Tunnel, killing 28.
- March 20 – India – A bus carrying schoolchildren fell off a bridge into a canal in Khammam district, killing 16 and injuring 18.
- April 20 – Mexico – A trailer truck collided with an overloaded bus in Veracruz, killing 43 and injuring 17.
- May 13 – Philippines – A jeepney plunged into a ravine in Bontoc, Mountain Province, killing 11.
- May 17 – Vietnam – A bus plunged into the banks of the Serepok River in Dak Lak, killing 34 and injuring 21.
- May 21 – Albania – Qafa e Vishës bus accident. A bus plunged 80 m (260 ft) off a cliff near Himarë, killing 13 and injuring 21.
- June 3 – Pakistan – A bus fell into a 100-foot ditch in Kahuta, killing 25 and injuring 60.
- July 7 – Ukraine – A bus rolled over along the Kyiv-Chernihiv motorway, killing 14.
- July 12 – Nigeria – Okobie road tanker explosion. A tanker overturned and exploded, killing 95.
- July 13 – South Africa – Hectorspruit level crossing accident. A coal train collided with a truck on a controlled level crossing, killing 26.
- July 15 – Nepal – A bus fell into an irrigation canal near Parasi, killing 39.
- July 20 – Mexico – A bus fell into a gully in Nayarit, killing 24 and injuring 14.
- July 21 – Philippines – A dump truck lost its brakes and fell sideways near Caibiran, killing 14 and injuring 10.
- July 23 – United States – A pickup truck carrying illegal immigrants travelling on Route 59 crashed into two trees near Berclair, Texas, killing 14 and injuring nine.
- July 27 – India – A truck fell into a gorge in Jammu and Kashmir, killing 16.
- July 30 – India – Two trucks collided in Haryana, killing 29.
- August 26 – China – Shaanxi bus–tanker crash. A double-decker sleeper bus and a tanker loaded with methanol collided and caught fire, killing 36.
- August 27 – India – Chala LPG tanker disaster. An LPG road tanker collided with a traffic barrier, causing a boiling liquid expanding vapor explosion, killing 20.
- September 2 – Iran – A bus struck a rock and flipped over, which then caused two cars to collide near Shiraz, killing 24 and injuring 25.
- October 2 – Peru – A bus fell into a ravine near Huarmaca, killing 22.
- October 2 – Philippines – A 14-wheeler truck rammed a jeep in Sarrat, killing 13.
- October 30 – Pakistan – A van and a truck collided in Bahawalpur, killing 26.
- November 1 – Saudi Arabia – Riyadh truck crash. A fuel truck crashed into an intersection flyover, killing 26.
- November 17 – Egypt – Manfalut railway accident. A school bus was hit by a train at a crossing, killing 51 and injuring 17.
- November 24 – India – A bus carrying a wedding party plunged into a 300-feet deep gorge in Udhampur district, killing 16 and injuring 44.
- December 9 – China – A bus fell into a pond in Minquan County, killing 12 and injuring 23.

=== 2013 ===
- January 11 – Nepal – A bus veered off a narrow mountain road during thick fog in Chhatiwan, killing 29 and injuring 12.
- January 23 – Bolivia – Two buses collided head-on near Taperas, killing 17 and injuring 34.
- January 27 – Portugal – A bus fell into a ravine near Sertã, killing 11 and injuring 32.
- February 4 – United Arab Emirates – A bus carrying migrant workers collided with another vehicle in Abu Dhabi emirate, killing 22 and injuring 24.
- February 7 – Zambia – Chibombo bus crash. A bus collided with a semi-truck and an SUV on the Great North Road, killing 51.
- February 9 – Chile – Tomé tragedy. A bus carrying football fans fell into a 100-meter ravine, killing 16.
- February 22 – Pakistan – A minibus in a wedding procession plunged into a canal near Charsadda, killing 19 and injuring 16.
- February 27 – Kenya – A bus overturned in Mwingi, killing 35.
- March 15 – South Africa – A double decker bus veered off the Hex River Pass near De Doorns, killing 24.
- March 27 – Peru – A bus accident on the Arequipa–Puno highway killed 26.
- April 3 – Papua New Guinea – A bus fell off a cliff near Mount Hagen, killing 24 and injuring two.
- April 5 – Nigeria – A bus and a petrol tanker collided on the Benin–Ore expressway, killing 60.
- April 14 – Peru – A bus fell into a river near Trujillo, killing 33.
- May 7 – Mexico – Ecatepec de Morelos gas tanker explosion. A gas tanker ran into several cars and houses before the truck exploded on Federal Highway 85, killing 27 and injuring 30.
- May 8 – India – A bus fell into a river in Himachal Pradesh, killing 33.
- May 25 – Pakistan – A gas cylinder exploded inside a school minivan in Gujrat, killing 17 and injuring seven.
- June 7 – India – A bus plunged off a mountain road in Himachal Pradesh, killing 18 and injuring 14.
- June 19 – Peru – A bus fell into the Tarma River, killing 45.
- June 23 – Montenegro – Podgorica bus crash. A bus carrying Romanian tourists plunged into a ravine, killing 19 and injuring 28.
- July 13 – Russia – Oznobishino bus crash. A truck collided with a bus, killing 18 and injuring 60.
- July 21 – Egypt – An army bus collided with a truck along the Mediterranean coastal highway, killing 15 soldiers.
- July 23 – Thailand – A tour bus and a truck collided in Saraburi, killing 19 and injuring 22.
- July 28 – Italy – Monteforte Irpino bus crash. A coach returning from a pilgrimage plunged 30 m (98 ft) off a flyover into a ravine, killing 39 and injuring 19.
- August 21 – Malaysia – Genting Highlands bus crash. A bus crashed into a ravine, killing 37 and injuring 16 in the deadliest road accident in Malaysia.
- August 21 – Indonesia – A car and a bus collided and plunged into a river in Cisarua, killing 19 and injuring 12.
- August 29 – Kenya – A bus veered off the road and plunged into a valley in Narok before rolling over several times, killing 41 and injuring 33.
- September 5 – South Africa – Pinetown crash. An articulated truck drove through a red light at high speed and hit several vehicles, killing 27 and injuring 80.
- September 5 – United Kingdom – Sheppey Crossing crash. More than 130 vehicles collided on the Sheppey Crossing, injuring 68.
- September 8 – Romania – Valea Lupului minibus train collision. A minibus and a train collided in Iași County, killing 11.
- September 9 – A bus crashed into a 200 m (660 ft) ravine after missing a sharp bend in San Martin Jilotepeque, killing 48 and injuring 37.
- September 9 – Iran – Two buses collided in Qom, killing 44 and injuring 39.
- September 18 – Canada – Ottawa bus–train crash. A double-decker bus and a train collided, killing six and injuring 35.
- October 3 - India - A cargo truck crashed into two minivans in Barpata district, killing 30 and injuring 18.
- October 10 – India – A truck carrying Hindu pilgrims crashed into a gorge in Hoshiarpur, killing 20 and injuring 35.
- October 12 – Peru – A bus plunged off a cliff and into the Cachimayo River, killing 51. This crash tied with the 2018 Pasamayo bus crash as the deadliest road crash in Peruvian history.
- October 19 – Philippines – Atimonan road crash. Three buses and four trucks collided in Atimonan, killing 20 and injuring 54.
- October 24 – Thailand – A bus carrying Buddhist worshippers from a temple plunged into a ravine in Wang Nuea, killing 20 and injuring 16.
- October 28 – China – A cement mixer rear-ended a motorized tricycle then collided with a minibus in Kuytun, killing 10 and injuring two.
- October 30 – India – Mahabubnagar bus accident. A bus hit a culvert, damaging its fuel tank and causing a fire, killing 45 and injuring seven.
- November 11 – South Africa – A bus collided with a truck in Mpumalanga, killing 29.
- November 18 – Egypt – A train ploughed into a lorry and a minibus near Cairo, killing 30 and injuring 28.
- December 10 – Egypt – Kafr Elle Zayat fuel truck explosion. A fuel truck exploded, killing 13.
- December 16 – Philippines – Metro Manila Skyway bus accident. A bus fell off the Metro Manila Skyway, killing 18 and injuring 20.

=== 2014 ===
- January 2 – India – A bus plunged off a cliff into a 400-foot ravine in Malshej Ghat, killing 30 and injuring 10.
- January 7 – Nigeria – Kirikiri tanker explosion. A tanker loaded with gasoline collided with parked vehicles and exploded, killing 15.
- January 15 – Pakistan – A school bus collided head-on with a garbage truck in Nawabshah, killing 20.
- February 3 – India – A tourist bus fell off a bridge in Khambatki Ghat, killing 10 and injuring 35.
- February 4 – Ukraine – A minibus was hit by a train near Vyry, killing 12 and injuring five.
- February 7 – Philippines – Mountain Province bus accident. A bus fell off a 150 m (490 ft) ravine in Bontoc, Mountain Province, killing 17.
- February 28 – Thailand – A school bus collided with a truck in Na Di district, killing 15 and injuring 60.
- March 10 – Egypt – A truck collided with a bus on a flooded highway in Asyut, killing 16.
- March 11 – Egypt – A bus collided with a parked car at Ain Moussa power station, killing 25 and injuring 27.
- April 13 – United States – A truck entered opposite traffic in Orland, California, before colliding with a sedan which collided with a bus which ignited, killing 10.
- April 13 – Mexico – Acayucan bus crash. A bus collided with a broken-down truck and caught fire in Veracruz, killing 36 and injuring four.
- April 15 – Togo – A bus crashed into a truck, killing 48 and injuring 15.
- April 20 – Pakistan – A bus rammed into a disabled flatbed trailer parked on the side of a highway in Pannu Aqil, killing 36.
- May 10 – United Arab Emirates – A bus hit a parked truck in Dubai, killing 15.
- May 18 – Colombia – Fundación bus fire. A bus caught fire, killing 32 children.
- June 2 – Nepal – A bus carrying pilgrims fell into the Madi River in Pyuthan district, killing 16 and injuring 58.
- June 17 – India – A bus fell into a mountain gorge in Saharanpur, killing 13.
- June 27 – Afghanistan – A truck and a minibus collided in Nangarhar, killing 17 and injuring nine.
- July 19 – China – A bus collided with a van carrying flammable liquids in Hunan, killing 38.
- August 8 – Peru – A bus overturned near Junín, killing 21 and injuring 15.
- August 9 – China – A tour bus fell off a 30 ft (9.1 m) cliff after being involved in a pileup in Nyêmo County, killing 44.
- August 17 – Afghanistan – A truck loaded with people and animals crashed in a mountainous area of Badghis, killing 33 and injuring 13.
- August 22 – Egypt – Two buses coming from opposite directions collided near Sharm el-Sheikh, killing 33.
- August 31 – Afghanistan – A fuel tanker collided with a van in Herat, killing 23.
- September 14 – Peru – A bus fell into a ravine near Chalhuanca, killing 27.
- October 5 – Peru – A bus veered off the road near Cajacay District, killing 18 and injuring 27
- October 6 – Nepal – A bus plummeted some 300 m (980 ft) down a road in Doti, killing 41.
- October 13 – Egypt – Three minibuses collided in Edfu, killing 30.
- November 5 – Egypt – A school bus, a fuel tanker and two passenger vehicles collided and caught fire in Damanhur, killing 17 and injuring 18.
- November 11 – Pakistan – A bus collided with a truck in Khairpur, killing 56.
- November 24 – Nepal – A bus plunged into the Bheri River in Jajarkot, killing 47.
- December 22 – United Kingdom – Glasgow bin lorry crash. A bin lorry vehicle mounted the pavement after its driver passed out at the wheel in George Square, killing six and injuring 15.

=== 2015 ===
- January 10 – Pakistan – Karachi traffic accident. An oil tanker travelling on the wrong side of the road collided with a bus, killing 62.
- January 12 – Peru – A bus fell into a ravine near Sicuani, killing 25.
- January 15 – United States – A prison bus collided with a freight train and fell off an embankment in Penwell, Texas, killing 10.
- February 3 – United States – Valhalla train crash. An SUV collided with a train at a grade crossing, killing six and injuring 15.
- February 4 – China – A minibus crashed in Meizhou during the first day for the peak travel season centered on the Chinese New Year, killing 10.
- February 13 – Egypt – Two tourist buses collided in South Sinai, killing 33.
- February 17 – India – A bus fell off a gorge in Dhar District, killing 10.
- March 11 – Tanzania – A bus and two trucks collided in Iringa, killing 41 and injuring 25.
- March 14 – Brazil – A tourist bus veered off a road and plunged 100 m (330 ft) into a ravine in Santa Catarina, killing 54 and injuring 10.
- March 21 – Egypt – A bus fell off a bridge into a canal in Giza, killing 35.
- March 24 – Peru – A collision between three buses and a truck in Huarmey province killed 37 and injured 70.
- March 30 – Peru – A bus fell into a ravine near Puquio, killing 21 and injuring 36.
- April 10 – Morocco – A bus caught fire after colliding with a gas tanker in Tan-Tan, killing 33.
- April 22 – Nepal – A bus fell off a hill near Kathmandu, killing 17 and injuring 30.
- May 5 – India – A bus fell into a ditch and caught fire in Panna district, killing 21.
- May 11 – India – A bus fell off a gorge near Marotthi, killing 23 and injuring 25.
- June 7 – Peru – A dump truck carrying dozens of school children dropped from a cliff in the Andes as it returned from Huanuco, killing 17 and injuring 54.
- June 10 – Peru – A landslide buried a van in Oyon province, killing 13 and injuring two.
- June 13 – India – A van carrying Hindu pilgrims from Tirumala lost control on a bridge and plunged into a river, killing 22.
- June 13 – India – A lorry and two tractors en route to a prayer ceremony collided in Harchandpur, killing 17.
- July 1 – China – Ji'an bus accident. A bus carrying visiting South Korean civil servants went off a bridge, killing 11 and injuring 17.
- July 29 – Mexico – A truck ran into a religious procession, killing 27 and injuring 149.
- August 9 – Sudan – Two trucks collided head-on in Um Al-Hasan, killing 19 and injuring 12.
- September 17 – South Sudan – Juba tanker explosion. A fuel truck exploded, killing 193.
- October 23 – France – Puisseguin road crash. A bus carrying elderly day-trippers hit a truck head-on and caught fire, killing 43.
- November 26 – Burkina Faso – A minibus veered off a road and fell into a dam in Kiebalogo, killing 22.
- December 10 – Ghana – A minibus collided head-on with a Metro Mass Transit bus near Bowiri, killing 14.
- December 14 – Argentina – Argentina road accident. A bus carrying border police plunged off a bridge, killing 43 and injuring eight.
- December 20 – Thailand – A tour bus hit a car and ran off a curve near Doi Saket, killing 13.

=== 2016 ===
- January 19 – Peru – A bus fell into the Tarma River in Junin Department, killing 16.
- February 5 — India — A bus fell off a bridge over the Purna River in Gujarat, killing 37.
- February 6 – Nepal – A bus fell off a cliff and into a ravine on the Pasang Lhamu Highway in Nuwakot District, killing 11 and injuring 12.
- February 10 – Pakistan – A tanker carrying liquified petroleum gas collided with a car in Sheikhupura before bursting into flames, killing 10.
- February 18 – Ghana – Ghana bus collision. A bus and a truck collided head-on, killing 71 and injuring 23.
- March 19 – Saudi Arabia – A bus crashed between Medina and Mecca, killing 19.
- March 20 – Spain – Erasmus bus crash. A bus carrying Erasmus students of 19 countries from the Valencia Fallas collided with a car on the Autovía A-7 near Freginals, killing 13.
- March 24 – France – A minibus collided with a truck near Montbeugny, killing 12.
- April 3 – Saudi Arabia – Two vans collided in Wadi bin Hashbal, killing 15.
- April 9 – Peru – A bus plunged into the Mapacho river in Urcos, killing 23 and injuring 32.
- April 17 – Peru – A bus fell into a ravine in Cerro de Pasco, killing 24 and injuring 30.
- April 17 – India – A bus carrying members of the Bharati Gananatya opera troupe crashed into a gorge in Odisha, killing 25 and injuring 11.
- May 7 – India – A bus fell into a gorge in Kangra district, killing 22 and injuring 78.
- May 8 – Afghanistan – Two buses collided with a fuel tanker in Ghazni Province, killing 73 and injuring 50.
- May 8 – India – A minibus fell into a gorge in Mandi District, after a portion of the road caved in, killing 14.
- May 21 — Democratic Republic of the Congo – A bus crashed in Sakania territory, killing 37 and injuring 22.
- June 6 – Saudi Arabia – A bus and a truck collided between Riyadh and Al-Qassim, killing 15 and injuring 60.
- June 7 – United States – Kalamazoo bicycle crash. A pickup truck crashed into a group of cyclists, killing five and injuring four.
- June 9 – Brazil – A bus plunged over a ravine in São Paulo, killing 18 and injuring 28.
- June 26 – China – A bus caught fire in Hunan, killing 35.
- July 19 – Taiwan – Taoyuan bus fire. A tour bus caught fire, killing 26.
- August 14 – Pakistan – A wedding bus fell into a ravine in Azad Kashmir, killing 25 and injuring 20.
- August 15 – Nepal – A bus rolled backwards off the road near Birtadeurali and fell over 300 m (980 ft), killing 33 and injuring 28.
- September 3 – Afghanistan – A bus collided with a fuel tanker in Zabol Province, killing 38 and injuring 28.
- September 27 – Nepal – A bus fell off a mountain road in Dhading District, killing 19 and injuring 13.
- October 14 – South Korea – A bus crashed and caught fire on the Gyeongbu Expressway near Ulsan, killing 10 and injuring nine.
- October 17 – Pakistan – Two buses collided in Khanpur, killing 24 and injuring 70.
- October 20 – Costa Rica – A bus fell off a cliff on the road to Nueva Cinchona, killing 12 and injuring 18.
- October 23 – United States – I-10 tour bus crash. A tour bus collided with the back of a stationary semi-trailer truck in California, killing 13 and injuring 31.
- November 21 – United States – Chattanooga school bus crash. A school bus crashed, killing six and injuring 32.
- December 23 – Malaysia – A bus fell into a ditch on a highway between Johore and Kuala Lumpur, killing 14 and injuring 16.

=== 2017 ===
- January 2 – Thailand – A minivan and a pick-up truck collided in Chonburi, killing 25.
- January 19 – India – A school bus collided with a truck in Etah, killing 15 and injuring 45.
- January 20 – Italy – Verona bus crash. A bus carrying school children from Hungary crashed and caught fire on the A4 near Verona, killing 17 and injuring 25.
- January 28 – Madagascar – A truck carrying wedding guests swerved off the road and plunged into a river in Anjorozobe, killing 47.
- February 13 – Taiwan – A tour bus crashed on a highway in Taipei, killing 32.
- February 18 – Argentina – A bus traveling to Chile overturned in Mendoza Province, killing 19.
- February 20 – Philippines – Tanay bus accident. A tourist bus lost control and hit an electric post in Tanay, Rizal, killing 15 and injuring 40.
- February 26 – India – A truck carrying villagers to church overturned on a mountain road in West Khasi Hills district, killing 16 and injuring 50.
- March 12 – Haiti – A bus ploughed through a crowd of people in Gonaïves while speeding away from an earlier accident, killing 38.
- March 27 – India – A bus fell off a bridge in Senapati district, killing 10.
- March 29 – United States – A car and a church minibus collided in Uvalde County, killing 13 and injuring two.
- April 18 – Philippines – A bus fell into a ravine in Carranglan, killing 31 and injuring 46.
- April 19 – India – A bus rolled off the road and fell into the Tons river in Nerwa, killing 44.
- April 21 – South Africa – A minibus crashed and caught fire in Bronkhorstspruit, killing 20 children.
- May 6 – Tanzania – A minibus plunged into a ravine in Karatu, killing 35.
- May 7 – Vietnam – A truck collided with a bus in Gia Lai province, killing 11 and injuring 23.
- May 13 – Turkey – A bus carrying tourists crashed near Marmaris, killing 17 and injuring 13.
- May 24 – Zambia – A bus lost control and fell off a cliff into a ditch near Luangwa, killing 14.
- May 28 – France – A motorcycle was left driving riderless for 9 km (5.6 mi) on the A4 after the driver fell off when he was struck by a vehicle pulling into his lane; it stood itself up and continued along the motorway, periodically scraping the median barrier which kept balance.
- June 5 - India - A bus caught fire after colliding with a truck in Bareilly, killing 22.
- June 25 – Pakistan – Bahawalpur explosion. A tanker truck overturned and exploded while people gathered to collect fuel, killing 219.
- July 2 – Russia – A bus collided with a truck and caught fire in Tatarstan, killing 14.
- July 3 – Germany – A tour bus caught fire after colliding with a lorry in Stammbach, killing 18.
- July 5 – Central African Republic – A truck crashed in Bambari, killing 78.
- July 20 – India – A bus slipped off the road and rolled down a gorge in Himachal Pradesh, killing 28.
- August 26 – United Kingdom – M1 motorway crash. Two lorries and a minibus collided, killing eight and injuring three.
- September 10 – Democratic Republic of Congo – A bus overturned near Kikwit, killing 25 and injuring 57.
- August 20 – South Africa – An overloaded minibus fell into an embankment in Pietermaritzburg, killing 19.
- October 28 – Nepal – A bus carrying passengers returning from a Hindu festival skidded off the Prithvi Highway and plunged into a river, killing 31.
- November 20 – Pakistan – A minibus and a truck collided head-on in Khairpur, killing 20 and injuring three.
- December 14 – France – Perpignan crash. A train crashed into a school bus on a level crossing between Millas and Saint-Féliu-d'Amont, killing six students and injuring 24.
- December 23 – Egypt – A bus collided with a truck in Cairo, killing 13 and injuring eight.
- December 23 – India – A bus plunged into a river in Sawai Madhopur district, killing 33.
- December 25 – Philippines – A jeepney collided with a bus in Agoo, killing 20.
- December 31 – Kenya – A bus collided with a truck in Migaa, killing 36.

=== 2018 ===
- January 2 – Peru – Pasamayo bus crash. A coach plunged off a cliff on a coastal road, killing 51. This incident tied with the 2013 Peru bus disaster as the deadliest road crash in Peruvian history.
- January 4 – South Africa – Hennenman–Kroonstad train crash. A train collided with a truck at a level crossing in Free State before derailing and catching fire, killing 21 and injuring 254.
- January 18 – Kazakhstan – Yrgyz bus fire. A bus caught fire, killing 52.
- January 20 – Turkey – A bus hit several trees on the side of the road in Eskişehir Province, killing 11 and injuring 44.
- January 29 – India – A bus swerved off a bridge and plunged into a river in West Bengal, killing 28.
- February 10 – Hong Kong – Tai Po bus accident. A double-decker bus overturned in the New Territories, killing 19 and injuring 65.
- February 11 – Indonesia – A tourist bus collided with a motorcycle before crashing into a hill and flipping onto its side in Subang Regency, killing 27 and injuring 18.
- February 11 – Argentina – A car collided head-on with a pickup truck on National Route 105 in Misiones, killing 10.
- February 14 – Libya – A truck overturned in Bani Walid, killing 23.
- February 21 – Peru – A bus veered off a road and plunged into a ravine in Arequipa Department, killing 44.
- March 20 – Philippines – A bus swerved off a road and fell into a ravine in Sablayan, killing 19.
- March 21 – Thailand – A tour bus lost control on a downhill curve and slid off the side of the road in Nakhon Ratchasima, killing 18.
- April 6 – Canada – Humboldt Broncos bus crash. A semi-trailer truck and a bus collided near Tisdale, Saskatchewan, killing 16 and injuring 13.
- April 10 – India – A truck overturned in Khandala, killing 18 and injuring 15.
- April 22 – North Korea – North Korea bus accident. A tourist bus in North Hwanghae fell off a bridge, killing 36.
- May 25 – Uganda – A bus in Kiryandongo District collided with a tractor before hitting a truck head-on, killing 22 and injuring 15.
- June 7 – India – A bus lost control then rammed into a stationary sand truck in Madhya Pradesh, killing 10.
- July 1 – India – An overcrowded bus crashed into a gorge in Pauri Garhwal, killing 48 and injuring 12.
- July 6 – Cameroon – A bus drove into a river in Bountourou, killing 28 and injuring five.
- July 29 – India – A bus plunged 150 meters into a ravine in Raigad district, killing 30 and injuring one.
- July 30 – Vietnam – A minibus collided head-on with a container truck in Quảng Nam province, killing 13 and injuring four.
- August 6 – Italy – 2018 Borgo Panigale explosion. A car carrier collided with a tanker truck carrying liquefied petroleum gas in Bologna and exploded, killing two and injuring 145.
- August 12 – Ecuador – A bus overturned in Molleturo, killing 12 and injuring 30.
- August 13 – Ethiopia – A bus fell off a bridge in Legambo, killing 38 and injuring 15.
- August 14 – Ecuador – A bus struck an ATV and overturned before hitting three houses in Quito, killing 24 and injuring 19.
- September 1 – Ecuador – A bus overturned in Cuenca, killing 10.
- September 7 – Tanzania – A truck carrying potatoes crashed into five vehicles in Mbeya, killing 15 and injuring 13.
- September 8 – Afghanistan – A passenger bus collided with a truck in Kandahar, killing 15 and injuring 25.
- September 10 – Mali – A truck plunged into a river after a suspected brake failure in Mopti Region, killing 20.
- September 11 – Philippines – A jeepney fell into a ravine in Balbalan, killing 14 and injuring 24.
- September 12 – India – An overcrowded bus rolled into a gorge in Jagtial district, killing 57 and injuring 31.
- September 17 – South Africa – A road crash involving a bus in Mokopane killed 11.
- September 18 – Iran – A collision between a passenger bus and a trailer carrying flammable materials in Isfahan killed 21.
- September 18 – Ecuador – A bus crashed in El Oro Province, killing 12 and injuring 27.
- September 30 – Kenya – A bus collided with a truck in Sogea, killing 11.
- October 5 – Russia – A head-on collision between two buses near Tver killed 13.
- October 6 – United States – Schoharie limousine crash. A stretch limousine failed to stop at an intersection and crashed, killing 20.
- October 6 – Democratic Republic of the Congo – Mbuba road tanker explosion. A fuel truck collided with another truck and exploded, killing 50 and injuring 100.
- October 10 – Kenya – A bus fell down a slope in Kericho, killing 55.
- October 28 – China – Chongqing bus crash. A bus plunged off the Wanzhou Yangtze River Bridge into the Yangtze River after a passenger attacked the driver for missing her stop, killing 15.
- October 28 – Pakistan – A bus plunged into a ravine in Kohistan, killing 17.
- November 3 – China – Lanzhou toll accident. A truck rammed into a line of 31 waiting cars, killing 15 and injuring 44.
- November 7 – Zimbabwe – Two buses collided in Rusape, killing 50 and injuring 80.
- November 16 – Zimbabwe – A bus exploded in Gwanda, killing 42.
- November 20 – Nigeria – A bus crashed in Enugu State, killing 11.
- December 21 – Nepal – A bus veered off a highway in Tulsipur and plunged into a river, killing 21 and injuring 15.

=== 2019 ===
- January 11 – Canada – Westboro station bus crash. A double-decker bus swerved and hit a bus shelter on approach to Westboro station in Ottawa, tearing off part of the upper deck, killing three and injuring 23.
- January 21 – Pakistan – Hub accident. A bus collided with a tanker truck in Balochistan, killing 26 and injuring 1.
- February 20 – Bangladesh – A collision in Dhaka between a pickup van and a car led to the latter's gas cylinder exploding. The fire then spread to a group of buildings being used to store chemicals, killing 80 and injuring 50.
- March 22 – Ghana – Two buses collided head-on in Kintampo, killing 50.
- March 28 – Guatemala – A truck ploughed through pedestrians while they were inspecting another road accident in Nahuala, killing 18.
- April 8 – Malaysia – A bus plunged into a drainage canal in Sepang, killing 11.
- April 17 – Portugal – Madeira bus crash. A tour bus carrying German tourists plunged off a road in Madeira, killing 29 and injuring 27.
- April 25 – United States – Lakewood semi-truck crash. A runaway semi-truck crashed into traffic on Interstate 70 in Colorado, killing four and injuring 10.
- April 27 – India – A bus fell into a gorge near the Panchpula bridge in Chamba district, killing 10.
- May 6 – Niger – A fuel tanker overturned and exploded in Niamey, killing 58.
- May 12 – Kenya – A bus crashed into a truck on the side of the road in Tana River County, killing 10.
- May 21 – Philippines – A jeepney overturned in Libon, Albay, killing 10 and injuring 20.
- May 29 – Mexico – A tour bus and a semitruck collided and caught fire on a mountain road in Maltrata, killing 21 and injuring 30.
- June 8 – Philippines – A jeepney fell into a ravine in San Fernando, Camarines Sur, killing 13 and injuring 41.
- June 12 – Egypt – Two microbuses crashed on a highway in Helwan, killing 14 and injuring 10.
- June 17 – South Africa – A bus and a taxi van collided in Modjadjiskloof, killing 24.
- June 20 – India – A bus fell into a drain in Himachal Pradesh, killing 44 and injuring 34.
- July 8 – India – A bus hit a divider and fell into a gap between two flyovers on the Yamuna Expressway in Agra, killing 29.
- July 18 – Turkey – A vehicle plunged off a road in Ipekyolu, killing 16 and injuring 51.
- August 10 – Tanzania – Morogoro tanker explosion. A fuel tanker crashed and exploded while people gathered to collect the fuel, killing 100 and injuring 47.
- August 18 – Uganda – A fuel truck crashed into three cars and exploded in Rubirizi, killing 19.
- August 30 – Pakistan – A bus plunged into a deep ravine in Upper Kohistan District, killing 24 and injuring two.
- September 17 – Philippines – A truck fell down a ravine in T'Boli, South Cotabato, killing 20 and injuring 12.
- September 22 – Pakistan – A bus carrying approximately 60 people slammed into a mountain along the Babusar Pass in Gilgit-Baltistan after the brakes failed while making a sharp turn, killing 26 and injuring 12.
- September 29 – China – A collision between a bus and a truck along the Changchun-Shenzhen expressway in Yixing, killed 36.
- October 5 – Romania – Sfântu Gheorghe minibus accident. A minibus was hit by a truck driving on the wrong side of the road, killing 10 and injuring eight.
- October 5 – United Kingdom – Totnes bus crash. A double-decker bus overturned on the A385 road in Devon, injuring over 50.
- October 16 – Saudi Arabia – A bus carrying Muslim pilgrims collided with a truck in Medina, killing 35 and injuring four.
- October 31 – Philippines – A rented truck fell into a ravine in Conner, Apayao, killing 19 and injuring 21.
- November 13 – Slovakia – A lorry carrying gravel collided with a bus in Nitra, killing 12.
- November 13 – Peru – A bus plunged into a ravine in Charat District, killing 19 and injuring 20.
- December 1 – Russia – A bus skidded off a bridge in Zabaykalsky Krai and plunged into the Kuenga River, killing 19.
- December 2 – Tunisia – A bus fell into a ravine in Ain Snoussi, killing 26.
- December 13 – Pakistan – A van hit a truck loaded with smuggled fuel in Killa Saifullah District, killing 14.
- December 15 – Nepal – A bus carrying Hindu pilgrims veered off a highway in Sindhupalchowk and crashed, killing 14 and injuring 18.
- December 18 – Mexico – A van crashed into a truck on a highway in Jalisco and caught fire, killing 14 and injuring 12.
- December 23 – Indonesia – A bus plunged into a ravine in Pagar Alam, killing 27.
- December 28 – Egypt – A collision between a minibus carrying workers and a truck in Port Said killed 22.

== 2020s ==
=== 2020 ===
- January 6 – Peru – A bus collided with other vehicles and rolled over in Arequipa, killing 16.
- January 9 – Iran – An accident on a bus in Mazandaran killed 20 and injured 24.
- January 10 – India – A double-decker bus caught fire after ramming into a truck in Kannauj, killing 20.
- February 20 – India – A bus and a truck collided head-on in Tamil Nadu, killing 20.
- February 24 – Peru – A bus collided with another bus near Arequipa, killing 13 and injuring 60.
- March 2 – South Africa – Centane bus crash. A 65-seater bus plunged into a gorge in Centane, killing 25 and injuring 62
- March 7 – Syria – A tank truck, two buses and another vehicle collided in the road between Damascus and Homs, killing 22 and injuring more than 70.
- March 9 – Ghana – Two buses collided in Kintampo, killing 35.
- April 22 – Australia – Eastern Freeway truck crash. A drug affected driver on Melbourne's Eastern Freeway ploughed into four police officers during a traffic stop, killing them instantly, after he swerved onto the emergency lane.
- July 3 – Pakistan — A van collided with a train at an unmanned railway crossing in Farooqabad, killing 20 and injuring seven.
- July 6 – Colombia – Tasajera explosion. A fuel truck overturned and exploded while locals tried to collect its contents, killing 45 and injuring 19.
- July 7 – China – Anshun bus crash. A bus plunged into the Hongshan Reservoir, killing 21 and injuring 16.
- July 28 – Mali – A minibus collided with a dump truck in Kangaba, killing 22 and injuring 21.
- September 15 – Ghana – A bus crashed into a truck in Kyekyewere, killing 14.
- September 26 – Pakistan – A van struck an object, careened off a road and caught fire near Karachi, killing 15 and injuring five.
- October 11 – Thailand – A bus collided with a train in Cha Choeng Sao, killing 17 and injuring 12.
- November 25 – Brazil – A bus and a truck collided in Taguai, killing 41.
- November 30 – Pakistan – A van crashed into a bus in foggy weather in Narang Mandi, killing 13 and injuring 17.
- December 31 – Algeria – A vehicle carrying migrants overturned in Ain Mguel, killing 20 and injuring 11.

=== 2021 ===
- January 19 – India – Fifteen laborers were crushed to death by a truck in Surat while they were sleeping by a road.
- January 27 – Cameroon – Dschang bus-truck crash. A truck illegally carrying fuel collided with a bus in Dschang Cliff, West Region, killing 53.
- February 11 – United States – Icy conditions from an ice storm caused a 133-vehicle pileup on Interstate 35W in Fort Worth, Texas, killing six and injuring 95.
- February 16 – India – A bus fell into a canal in Sidhi after the driver lost control, killing 51.
- March 2 – United States – Imperial County car crash. An SUV and a semi-truck collided in Imperial County, California, killing 13 and injuring 13.
- March 2 – Bolivia – A bus traveling along Route 7 fell into a ravine in Colomi, killing 20 and injuring 13.
- March 5 – Egypt – A trailer-truck crashed into a microbus in Atfih, killing 18 and injuring five.
- March 10 – Indonesia – A bus carrying pilgrims fell into a ravine on Sumedang Regency, killing 27 and injuring 39.
- April 1 – Ivory Coast – A bus collided with a semi-trailer truck in Nambonkaha, killing 16.
- April 4 – China – A four-vehicle collision involving a bus on the Shenyang–Haikou Expressway in Jiangsu caused by a truck tire falling off killed 11 and injured 19.
- April 5 – Ivory Coast – Two separate accidents on the highway linking Abidjan to the north of the country killed 14.
- April 7 – Mexico – Two buses collided near Caborca, killing 16 and injuring 14.
- April 9 – Democratic Republic of the Congo – A bus crashed and caught fire in Kiwawa, killing 40 and injuring 31.
- April 12 – Peru – A bus skidded and overturned in Ancash Department, killing 20 and injuring 14.
- April 14 – Egypt – A bus collided with a truck and caught fire in Asyut, killing 20 and injuring three.
- May 20 – Pakistan – A bus overturned on a highway in Sukkur, killing 13 and injuring 29.
- May 24 – Guinea-Bissau – A truck crashed into homes in Cambese, killing 14.
- June 11 – Pakistan – A bus carrying pilgrims overturned in Khuzdar, killing 18 and injuring 42.
- June 18 – Peru – A bus carrying mine workers fell into a ravine in Ayacucho Department, killing 17 and injuring 14.
- June 19 – United States – A multiple-vehicle collision occurred on Interstate 65 in Butler County, Alabama, killing 10 and injuring one.
- July 11 – Turkey – A minibus carrying illegal immigrants crashed and caught fire in Muradiye, killing 12 and injuring 26.
- July 19 – Pakistan – A bus collided head-on with a truck on Taunsa Road in Dera Ghazi Khan, killing 33 and injuring 40.
- July 25 – Croatia – A bus swerved off a highway near Slavonski Brod, killing 10 and injuring 45.
- July 26 – China – A bus overturned on the G22 Qingdao–Lanzhou Expressway in Gansu, killing 13 and injuring 45.
- July 31 – Democratic Republic of the Congo – A fuel truck and a bus collided in Kibuba, killing 33.
- August 3 – Mali – A bus collided with a truck in Segou, killing 37.
- August 4 – United States – A van crashed near Encino, Texas, killing 10 and injuring 20.
- August 27 – Peru – A bus fell into a ravine in Cotabambas province, killing 15 and injuring three.
- August 31 – Peru – A bus fell into an ravine near the Rimac River, killing 33.
- September 2 – Iran – A minibus overturned and plunged off a road into a valley in Kordestan, killing 16 and injuring 12.
- September 4 – Egypt – A bus overturned on the Cairo-Suez Highway, killing 12 and injuring 38.
- September 4 – China – A heavy-duty semi-trailer towing a trailer collided with a four-wheel tractor on the G229 in Heilongjiang, killing 15 and injuring one.
- September 12 – Algeria – A semi-trailer truck collided with a bus along National Road 6, killing 18 and injuring six.
- October 12 – Nepal – A bus carrying 45 passengers fell into a river in Mugu District, killing 28 and injuring 12.
- November 3 – Pakistan – A 40-seater bus carrying more than 30 passengers fell into a ditch in Pallandri, killing 23 and injuring seven.
- November 5 – Sierra Leone – Freetown fuel tanker explosion. A collision between a fuel tanker and a lorry at a busy junction resulted in an explosion and a fire that killed 151 and injured 304.
- November 7 – Mexico – Highway 150D toll booth disaster. A truck crashed through the San Marcos Huixtoco tollbooth and collided with six cars, igniting a fire, killing 19 and injuring three.
- November 23 – Bulgaria – Bosnek bus crash. A bus carrying North Macedonia tourists crashed and caught fire, killing 45 and injuring seven.
- November 26 – Mexico – A bus carrying Roman Catholic pilgrims from Michoacán to the Chalma temple crashed in San José el Guarda, killing 19 and injuring 20.
- December 4 – Kenya – A bus carrying wedding guests plunged into the Enziu River in Mwingi, killing 23.
- December 7 – Ukraine – A minibus and a truck collide head-on in Chernihiv Oblast, killing 13 and injuring seven.
- December 9 – Mexico – Chiapas truck crash. A truck carrying over 180 smuggled migrants on Mexican Federal Highway 190 overturned and hit the base of a pedestrian bridge, killing 55 and injuring 100.
- December 14 – Haiti – Cap-Haïtien fuel tanker explosion. A fuel truck overturned and exploded, killing 90 and injuring 120 after locals tried to collect spilled fuel.

=== 2022 ===
- January 7 – Palestine – West Bank bus crash. A truck and minibus collided at Petzal Junction on Highway 90, killing eight and injuring two.
- January 8 – Egypt – Two buses collided in South Sinai Governorate, killing 16 and injuring 18.
- January 12 – Philippines– A small truck packed with partygoers overturned in Balingasag, killing 11.
- January 20 – Ghana – Bogoso explosion. A truck transporting mining explosives collided with a motorcycle. The resulting explosion levelled the nearby village of Apiate, killing 13 and injuring 200.
- January 29 – United States – North Las Vegas car crash. A collision between a Dodge Challenger and multiple vehicles in North Las Vegas killed nine.
- February 7 – Indonesia – A tour bus crashed while descending a steep hill at Bantul, killing 13 and injuring 34.
- February 10 – Peru –A bus fell into a ravine in Pataz, killing 20 and injuring 33.
- March 18 – Tanzania – A bus crashed into a truck in Melela Kibaoni, killing 22 and injuring 38.
- March 20 – Belgium – Strépy-Bracquegnies car crash. A motorist drove through a crowd celebrating Carnival in Strépy-Bracquegnies, killing six and injuring 40.
- April 13 — Egypt — A tourist bus collided with a truck and caught fire in Luxor, killing 10.
- April 13 – Indonesia — A truck carrying 29 people overturned in West Papua, killing 18.
- April 14 – Zimbabwe – A bus carrying churchgoers to an Easter gathering crashed in Chipinge, killing 35 and injuring 71.
- April 20 – Nigeria – A minibus collided with a vehicle in Bauchi State, killing 20 and injuring one.
- May 4 – Ukraine – A minibus, a bus and a fuel truck collided with each other in Rivne Oblast, killing 26.
- May 4 – Uganda – A bus crashes into a tea estate in Fort Portal, killing 20.
- May 16 — Indonesia — A bus carrying tourists crashed into a billboard and flipped on the Surabaya–Mojokerto Toll Road, killing 14 and injuring 19.
- May 19 — Mexico — A bus crashed on a highway in Jalisco, killing 14 and injuring 20.
- June 5 — India — A bus carrying 55 wedding guests fell into a 500-metre-deep gorge in Uttarakhand, killing 32 and injuring 23.
- June 7 – Pakistan – Killa Saifullah bus crash: A bus fell into a ravine in Killa Saifullah District, killing 22.
- July 4 – India – A bus carrying schoolchildren fell a hillside near Kullu, killing 12.
- July 18 — Indonesia — A fuel truck crashed into two cars and ten motorcycles at an intersection in Cibubur, killing 11.
- July 19 – Egypt – A bus slammed into a truck in Minya, killing 23 and injuring 30.
- July 24 – Kenya – A bus fell off a bridge and plunged some 40 metres into the Nithi River in Tharaka Nithi, killing 34.
- August 4 – Philippines – Ten died in a collision involving a ten-wheeler hauler truck, a van, and a pick-up truck in General Santos.
- August 6 – Croatia – Breznički Hum bus crash. A bus carrying Polish pilgrims to Medjugorje in Bosnia-Herzegovina veered off the A4 between Jarek Bisaški and Podvorec, killing 12 and injuring 32.
- August 13 – Pakistan – A van and a truck collided in Rahim Yar Khan, killing 13 and injuring five.
- August 16 – Pakistan – A sleeper bus coming from Lahore to Karachi on the M-5 motorway caught fire after a collision with an oil tanker near Multan, killing 20 and injuring six.
- August 20 – Turkey – Two separate bus crashes killed 35 in Gaziantep and Mardin Provinces.
- August 21 – Russia – A truck collided with a minibus in Ulyanovsk, killing 16 and injuring three.
- August 31 – Indonesia – A truck lost its brakes and crashed near a bus stop outside a school, toppling a concrete communications tower and crashing into two motorcycles in Bekasi, killing 10 and injuring 23.
- September 9 – Nigeria – Two buses collided in Lanlate, killing 20 and injuring two.
- September 10 – Mexico – A bus collided with a double-tanker fuel truck in Tamaulipas, killing 20.
- September 13 – India – A minibus fell into a gorge in Poonch district, killing 12 and injuring 30.
- September 14 – Myanmar – A three-vehicle collision in Kyaukpadaung killed 14 and injured 25.
- September 16 – South Africa – A minibus collided with a truck near Pongola, KwaZulu-Natal, killing 19.
- September 18 – China – Guizhou bus crash. A bus carrying 47 COVID-19 patients overturned, killing 27 and injuring 20.
- October 1 – India – Kanpur road accident. A tractor carrying pilgrims overturned and fell into a pond, killing 26 and injuring nine.
- October 5 – India – Palakkad bus accident. A bus rear-ended another bus, killing nine and injuring 38.
- October 6 – Nepal – A bus overturned in Bara District, killing 16 and injuring 20.
- October 8 – India – A bus collided with a diesel tanker and caught fire in Nashik, killing 12 and injuring 30.
- October 12 – Pakistan – A bus caught fire in Karachi, killing 18.
- October 15 – Colombia – A bus overturned on the Pan-American Highway in Nariño Department, killing 20 and injuring 15.
- October 22 – India – A bus collided with a truck in Rewa district, killing 15 and injuring 40.
- October 25 – Egypt – A truck slammed into a minibus in Dakahlia, killing 10.
- November 4 – India – A bus and a car collided in Madhya Pradesh, killing 11 and injuring one.
- November 12 – Egypt – A minibus fell into a canal in Dakahlia, killing 20.
- November 15 – Egypt – A minibus and a truck collided in Abu Minqar, killing 14.
- November 17 – Pakistan – A minibus plunged into a ditch near Sehwan, killing 20 and injuring 14.
- November 22 – Nigeria – Two buses collided in Maiduguri and caught fire, followed by a third bus that crashed into them, killing 37.
- December 12 – Nepal – A truck carrying wedding guests veered off a mountain highway in Chedagad, killing all 12 aboard.
- December 13 – Nepal – A bus bumped the side wall of a mountainous road in Bethanchowk, killing 17 and injuring 22.
- December 17 – Afghanistan – Salang Tunnel fire. A fuel tanker caught fire inside the Salang Tunnel, killing 31 and injuring 37.
- December 21 – India – A school bus overturned in Noney district, killing 15.
- December 23 – India – A truck carrying soldiers skidded down a steep slope into a gorge in Chatten, killing 16 and injuring four.
- December 24 – South Africa – Boksburg explosion. A fuel tanker carrying liquefied petroleum gas (LPG) exploded underneath a railway bridge, killing 40.
- December 27 – Sudan – Omdurman bus crash. A bus and a dump truck collided, killing 16 and injuring 19.
- December 31 – Mexico – A bus carrying tourists flipped on a highway in Nayarit, killing 15 and injuring 47.

=== 2023 ===
- January 4 – Nigeria – A minibus and an articulated trailer crashed head-on and caught fire in Nabardo, killing 18.
- January 5 – Ivory Coast – A bus carrying funeral mourners collided with another bus in Yamoussoukro, killing 14 and injuring dozens.
- January 6 – Uganda – A bus crashed in North Kyoga, killing 16 and injuring 21.
- January 7 – Kenya – A bus crashed in Lwakhakha, killing 21 and injuring 49.
- January 8 – Senegal – Kaffrine bus crash. Two buses collided in Gniby, killing 40 and injuring 101.
- January 8 – China – A truck crashed into a funeral procession in Nanchang County, killing 19 and injuring 20.
- January 14 – Nigeria – A speeding bus lost control and rammed into a truck on an expressway in Oniworo, killing 10.
- January 16 – Senegal – A bus collided with a truck in Louga, killing 22 and injuring 20.
- January 26 – Chad – A bus crashed into a broken down truck near Batha, killing 20.
- January 28 – Peru – A bus plunged off a cliff in El Alto District, killing 24.
- January 29 – Pakistan – A bus fell off a bridge into a ravine and burst into flames in Lasbela District, killing 41 and injuring three.
- January 29 – Benin – A bus crashed into a truck and caught fire in Dassa-Zoumé, killing 22 and injuring 21.
- February 3 – Pakistan – A bus collided head-on with a truck in Kohat District, killing 17.
- February 4 – China – Nearly 50 vehicles were involved in a crash on a highway in Changsha, killing 16 and injuring 66.
- February 14 – South Africa – A tour bus collided head-on with an armoured cash-in-transit van on the N1 in Louis Trichardt before tumbling into a river, killing 20 and injuring 68.
- February 14 – Vietnam – Quảng Nam road crash. A car collided with a container truck in Quảng Nam, killing 10 and injuring 11.
- February 15 – Panama – Gualaca bus crash. A bus fell off a cliff in Gualaca District, killing 42 and injuring 24.
- February 19 – Pakistan – A bus fell into a ravine near Kallar Kahar, killing 15 and injuring 64.
- February 20 – Belarus – A truck carrying sand collided with a bus near Smalyavichy, killing 11 and injuring 10.
- February 23 – India – A cement-loaded truck rammed into two buses carrying passengers returning from a government rally in Sidhi, killing 15.
- February 25 – Pakistan – A bus hit a van on a motorway in Rahim Yar Khan, killing 13.
- March 19 – Bangladesh – A bus skidded off the road and tumbled into a 30 ft (9.1 m) ditch in Madaripur District, killing 19 and injuring 25.
- March 27 – Saudi Arabia – A bus taking pilgrims to Mecca overturned and caught fire after crashing into a bridge in ʿAsir Province, killing 20 and injuring 29.
- March 30 – Kenya – A bus and a minibus collided in Naivasha, killing 14.
- April 10 – Peru – A bus fell into the Rimac River in Lima Department, killing 10 and injuring 25.
- April 14 – Indonesia – A truck lost its brakes at a toll road in Boyolali Regency and collided with a car, before slamming into multiple parked vehicles, killing eight.
- April 16 – Kenya – A bus suffered a brake failure and fell down a slope on the way to Mwatate, killing 13.
- April 29 – Mexico – A bus fell down a ravine in Nayarit, killing 18 and injuring 33.
- May 4 – Egypt – A bus and a truck collided on the Asyut-Kharga highway in New Valley Governorate, killing 17 and injuring 29.
- May 6 – Turkey – A truck collided with nine cars and two minibuses in Hatay Province, killing 12 and injuring 31.
- May 9 – India – A bus fell off a bridge in Khargone district, killing 22 and injuring 35.
- May 14 – Mexico – A van collided with a freight truck near Ciudad Victoria, with both vehicles catching fire, killing 26.
- May 18 – China – A vehicle carrying 14 people fell off a cliff and into a pool of water in Guangxi, killing 11.
- May 30 – Ghana – A bus and a fuel truck collided head-on in Gomoa Okyereko, killing 15 and injuring 20.
- May 30 – India – A bus carrying Vaishno Devi pilgrims fell into a gorge in Jammu and Kashmir, killing 10 and injuring 57.
- June 3 – Malawi – A lorry carrying 80 passengers overturned and collided with the road embankment in Karonga District, killing 25 and injuring 12.
- June 7 – Bangladesh – A truck collided with a van carrying construction workers in Dakshin Surma Upazila, killing 15.
- June 11 – Australia – Hunter Valley bus crash. A bus carrying guests from a wedding at Lovedale to Singleton overturned, killing 10 and injuring 25.
- June 15 – Canada – Carberry bus crash. A vehicle crash on the Trans-Canada Highway near Carberry, Manitoba, killed 17.
- June 17 – Pakistan – A bus overturned in Chakwal District, killing 14 and injuring 20.
- June 25 – India – Two buses collided head-on in Digapahandi, killing 12 and injuring seven.
- June 30 – Kenya – Kericho truck crash. A lorry carrying a shipping container lost control in Londiani and rammed into vehicles and pedestrians, killing 52 and injuring 30.
- July 1 – India – Buldhana bus accident. A private bus travelling on the Samruddhi Expressway in Buldhana district caught fire, killing 26 and injuring seven.
- July 5 – Mexico – A bus fell into a 25-meter gully in the Mixteca Region, killing 29 and injuring 20.
- July 19 – Algeria – A bus collided head-on with a pickup truck carrying fuel cans and caught fire in Outoul, killing 34 and injuring 12.
- July 26 – Senegal – A bus overturned in Ngeune Sarr, killing 23.
- August 3 – Mexico – A bus carrying 42 passengers, mostly foreigners and migrants heading to the United States, plunged off a ravine outside Tepic, killing 18.
- August 6 – Morocco – A minibus carrying 24 passengers overturned on a bend and plunged off a ravine at the foot of the Atlas Mountains in Demnate, killing all on board.
- August 20 – Pakistan – A bus caught fire in Punjab, killing 18.
- August 20 – Peru – A bus fell into a ravine on the Pisco-Ayacucho highway in Huaytará, killing 15.
- August 21 – Turkey – A bus crashed into a roadside ditch in Yozgat, killing 12 and injuring 19.
- August 22 – Mexico – A bus collided with a trailer truck in Tehuacan along the Cuacnopalan-Oaxaca highway, killing 16 and injuring 36.
- September 1 – Iraq – Two minibuses carrying pilgrims for Arbaeen collided in Saladin Governorate, killing 16 and injuring 13.
- September 17 – South Africa – Twenty employees of the mining firm De Beers were killed after a bus taking them to the Venetia Diamond Mine collided with a truck in Musina.
- September 18 – Peru – A bus plunged into a ravine in Huaccoto, killing 24 and injuring 21.
- October 1 – Mexico – A cargo truck clandestinely carrying Cuban migrants heading to the US overturned near the Guatemalan border in Chiapas, killing 10 and injuring 17.
- October 3 – Italy – Venice bus crash. A tourist bus plunged 15 metres (50 feet) off a flyover and caught fire in mainland Venice, killing 21 and injuring 18.
- October 6 – Mexico – A bus carrying Haitian and Venezuelan migrants heading to the US lost flipped over on a curve of the Oaxaca-Cuacnopalan highway, killing 16 and injuring 27.
- October 13 – Germany – Mühldorf van crash. A van carrying illegal immigrants overturned in Mühldorf, killing seven and injuring 16.
- October 28 – Egypt – A pileup in Beheira Governorate on the Cairo-Alexandria road killed 32 and injured 63.
- November 14 – Zimbabwe – A minibus collided head on with a truck on a highway between Bulawayo and Beitbridge, killing 22 and injuring two.
- November 15 – India – A bus traveling in Doda district fell off the road and plunged into a 300-foot gorge, killing 36 and injuring 19.
- November 21 – Peru – A bus fell into an ravine in Corongo, killing 20 and injuring six.
- November 22 – Nigeria – A truck carrying food items and more than 200 passengers crashed in Takalafia, killing 25 and injuring dozens.
- December 5 – Thailand – A double-decker bus crashed into a tree in Prachuap Khiri Khan province, killing 14 and injuring 32.
- December 5 – Philippines – A bus fell into a ravine in Hamtic, killing 18 and injuring 10.
- December 5 – Honduras – A bus fell into a ravine after crashing into a bridge near Tegucigalpa, killing 10.
- December 10 – Nigeria – A truck filled with people and goods driving along the Kaduna–Abuja expressway in Audi Jangon lost control and drove into a ditch, killing 18 and injuring 27.
- December 13 – Venezuela – In Caracas, a truck crashed into cars, causing a 17 vehicle pile-up that killed 16 and injured six.
- December 26 – Liberia – A fuel truck crashed and exploded while residents were collecting spilled fuel in Totota, killing 40 and injuring 83.
- December 28 – India – A bus collided with a truck and caught fire in Guna district, killing 13 and injuring 16.
- December 28 – Turkey – A pileup involving seven vehicles in dense fog on the Otoyol 7 in Sakarya Province killed 10 and injured 57.

=== 2024 ===
- January 3 – India – A bus carrying 45 passengers collided with a truck in Golaghat District, killing 12 and injuring 30.
- January 8 – Brazil – A truck and tourist minibus crashed on a highway near São José do Jacuípe, killing 25 and injuring six.
- January 12 – Nepal – A bus lost control and veered off into a river in Bhalubang, killing 12 and injuring 23.
- January 21 – Democratic Republic of the Congo – A truck carrying goods and passengers fell into a ravine in Kasangulu, killing 18 and injuring 21.
- January 30 – Mexico – A truck collided with a bus in Elota, killing 19 and injuring 18.
- February 9 – Democratic Republic of the Congo – A bus collided with a truck in Kinshasa, killing 18 and injuring two.
- February 13 – Egypt – A truck crashed into four microbuses in Amreya, killing 15 and injuring eight.
- February 19 – Mali – A bus collided with a truck between Kessedougou and Ouan, killing 15 and injuring 46.
- February 21 – Philippines – A truck loaded with passengers fell into a ravine in Mabinay, killing 15 and injuring two.
- February 24 – India – A tractor pulling a wagon loaded with Hindu pilgrims overturned and fell into a pond in Kasganj District, killing 23 and injuring nine.
- February 24 – Mexico – A tractor-trailer and a pick-up truck collided in San Luis Potosi, killing 10.
- February 27 – Mali – A bus fell off a bridge in Koumantou, killing 31 and injuring 10.
- February 28 – Honduras – Two buses collided head-on in San Juan de Opoa, killing 17 and injuring 14.
- March 17 – Afghanistan – A bus collided with a motorcycle then an oil tanker in Grishk District, killing 21 and injuring 38.
- March 18 – Kenya – A bus carrying university students from Nairobi to Mombasa collided with a truck in Maungu, killing 11 and seriously injuring 42.
- March 20 – China – A bus crashed into a tunnel wall along the Hohhot–Beihai Expressway in Linfen, killing 14 and injuring 37.
- March 25 – Philippines – A van collided with a truck and caught fire in Antipas, Cotabato, killing 17 and injuring four.
- March 28 – South Africa – Mamatlakala highway accident. A bus carrying pilgrims from Botswana fell off a bridge and into a ravine in the Mamatlakala mountain pass in Limpopo, killing 45 and injuring one.
- April 4 – Bolivia – A bus and a truck collided on a road between Oruro and Potosí, killing 14 and injuring two.
- April 8 – Indonesia – A minivan crashed into a bus along the Jakarta–Cikampek Toll Road in Karawang Regency, killing all 12 on board the minivan and injuring two on the bus.
- April 10 – Pakistan – A bus carrying pilgrims crashed into a ditch in Lasbela District, killing 17 and injuring 16.
- April 16 – Bangladesh – A bus and a pick-up truck collided head-on in Faridpur, killing 14.
- April 28 – Peru – A bus fell into a river in Cajamarca Department, killing 25 and injuring 13.
- April 28 – Mexico – A bus overturned in Malinalco, killing 18 and injuring 32.
- May 3 – Pakistan – A bus fell into a ravine along the Karakoram Highway in Gilgit-Baltistan, killing 20 and injuring 30.
- May 11 – Indonesia – A bus crashed into other vehicles before hitting an electricity pole following a suspected brake malfunction in Subang, killing 11 and injuring 53.
- May 21 – Egypt – A minibus fell off a ferry into the Nile River in Abu Ghalib, killing 11 and injuring nine.
- May 25 – Pakistan – A truck collided with a van in Jhirk, killing 11 and injuring 15.
- May 26 – Turkey – A bus collided with three other vehicles in Tarsus, killing 10 and injuring 39.
- May 29 – Pakistan – A bus fell off a ravine in Washuk, killing 29 and injuring 22.
- May 30 – India – A bus carrying Hindu pilgrims fell into a gorge in Jammu and Kashmir, killing 21 and injuring 35.
- June 15 – Nepal – A minibus skidded off the road and fell into the Alaknanda River on Badrinath national highway, killing 12 and injuring 14.
- July 5 – Brazil – A bus collided with a bridge pillar in São Paulo state, killing 10 and injuring 42.
- July 6 – Ukraine – An oil truck collided with a minibus in Rivne Oblast, killing 14 and injuring one.
- July 10 – India – A double-decker bus collided with a milk truck along an expressway in Uttar Pradesh, killing 18 and injuring 19.
- July 10 – Pakistan – A jeep fell off a ravine in the Neelam Valley in Azad Kashmir, killing 14 and injuring one.
- July 10 – South Africa – A small truck collided with the back of a school bus in Merafong, killing 13 and injuring seven.
- July 10 – Philippines – A bus collided with a pickup truck in Abulug, killing 11 and injuring five.
- July 12 – Nepal – Madan Ashrit Highway disaster. Two buses were pushed off the Madan Ashrit Highway into the Trishuli River by a landslide, killing 19, injuring three and leaving 40 presumed dead. Another landslide caused a bus to crash on a different section on the highway, killing the driver.
- July 16 – Afghanistan – A bus traveling on the Kabul-Balkh highway overturned in Baghlan Province, killing 17 and injuring 34.
- July 16 – Peru – A bus fell off a cliff in Ayacucho Department, killing 29 and injuring 17.
- July 21 – Bolivia – A bus traveling to Chile collided head-on with a truck on a highway between Patacamaya and the Chilean town of Tambo Quemado, killing 22 and injuring 16.
- July 25 – Mali – Two buses collided in San, killing 16 and injuring 48.
- August 20 – Iran – A bus carrying Pakistani pilgrims to Iraq overturned in Yazd Province, killing 28 and injuring 23.
- August 23 – Nepal – A bus carrying Indian pilgrims fell from the Prithvi Highway into the Marshyangdi River near Anbu Khaireni, killing 27 and injuring 16.
- August 25 – Pakistan – A bus fell off a ravine along the Makran Coastal Highway in Lasbela District, killing 12 and injuring 32.
- August 25 – Pakistan – A bus fell off a ravine in Kahuta, killing all 24 on board.
- August 29 – Mali — A bus collided head-on with a truck in Bamako, killing 14 and injuring 29.
- September 1 – Dominican Republic – A truck crashed into a bar in Azua, killing 11 and injuring 40.
- September 1 – Bangladesh – A bus collided with truck before falling into a ditch in Gopalganj, killing 10 and injuring 15.
- September 2 – South Africa – A bus veered off Van Rhyns Pass in the Western Cape and plunged down a mountain, killing 10 and injuring 29.
- September 3 – China – A school bus ran into a crowd after its driver lost control outside a school in Tai'an, killing 11 and injuring 12.
- September 6 – Ivory Coast – A tanker truck collided with a bus between Bouake and Korhogo and caught fire, killing 13 and injuring 44.
- September 8 – Nigeria – A tanker truck collided with a cattle truck in Agaie, killing 52 people and 50 cows.
- September 8 – Yemen – A bus overturned in Al Maqatirah District, killing 14 and leaving only one injured survivor.
- September 9 – Senegal – A bus collided with a lorry near Ndangalma, killing 16 and injuring 22.
- September 17 – Nigeria – A bus carrying Muslims celebrating Mawlid collided with a truck in Lere, killing 25 and injuring 38.
- September 17 – Iran – A bus overturned in Yazd Province, killing 10 and injuring 41.
- September 18 – Libya – A bus carrying Egyptian migrants overturned on the Desert Road in Derna, killing 11 and injuring 15.
- September 26 – Ethiopia – A bus fell into a river in Wolayita Zone, killing 28 and injuring 19.
- September 30 – Guinea – A minibus fell into a river near Kissidougou, killing 13.
- October 1 – Thailand – 2024 Thailand school bus fire. A bus carrying students crashed into a highway barrier and caught fire near Bangkok, killing 25 and injuring 19.
- October 4 – India – A truck collided with a tractor trolley in Bhadohi district, killing 10 and injuring three.
- October 14 – Egypt – A bus overturned on the Al-Galala highway in Suez Governorate, killing 12 and injuring 33.
- October 14 – Ghana – A bus fell into a ditch in Kwapia, Ashanti Region, killing 13.
- October 25 – Mexico – A bus overturned after colliding with a trailer that had been detached from a truck in Zacatecas, killing 24 and injuring five.
- October 29 – Algeria – A minibus and a truck collided head-on in Ouargla, killing 11 and injuring one.
- November 3 – Ecuador – A truck fell into a ravine along the Paute River in Morona-Santiago Province, killing 10 and leaving one survivor.
- November 4 – India – 2024 Almora bus accident. A bus fell off a 60-meter gorge in Marchula, killing 36 and injuring 27.
- November 10 – Ivory Coast – An unspecified road accident occurred on a highway between Soubré and Gagnoa, killing 21 and injuring 10.
- November 12 – Pakistan – A bus fell into the Indus River in Gilgit-Baltistan, killing 18 and injuring one.
- November 24 – Brazil – A bus fell off a ravine in Alagoas, killing 17.
- December 6 – Ivory Coast – A collision between two minibuses in Brokoua killed 26 and injured 28.
- December 7 – Belize – A multiple-vehicle collision of a motorcycle, a car, and an SUV on Benque Road, Cayo District, deemed "the worst road traffic accident in Belize" by the Amandala, killed 10 and injured four.
- December 18 – Afghanistan – Two separate crashes along the Kabul–Kandahar Highway in Ghazni Province killed 50 and injured 76.
- December 20 – India – An LPG tank truck caught fire and exploded after a truck crashed into it in Jaipur, killing 11 and injuring 45.
- December 21 – Brazil – 2024 Minas Gerais road crash. A bus and a car collided with a truck carrying a granite block in Teofilo Otoni, killing 39 and injuring seven.
- December 29 – Ethiopia – 2024 Sidama truck crash. A truck fell into a river in Bona Zuria, killing 71.
- December 30 – Pakistan – A bus overturned in Fateh Jang, killing 11 and injuring seven.

=== 2025 ===
- January 3 – Colombia – A bus fell into a ravine in Nariño Department, killing 13 and injuring 30.
- January 3 – Kenya – A shuttle collided head-on with a lorry on the Eldoret-Kitale highway, killing 10.
- January 6 – South Africa – A truck crashed into a minibus and another vehicle on Van Reenen's Pass in KwaZulu-Natal, killing 18 and seriously injuring an infant.
- January 11 – Pakistan – A truck crashed onto a passenger vehicle in Karak, killing 10 and injuring 15.
- January 12 – Libya – A bus crashed on a highway in Al-Loud, killing 23 and injuring five.
- January 21 – Ivory Coast – A bus and a truck collided in Ponan-Ouinlo, killing 17 and injuring 23.
- January 22 – India – A truck overturned and fell into a ravine along National Highway 63 in Yellapur, killing 10 and injuring 15.
- January 25 – Nigeria – A fuel tanker crashed into 17 vehicles along the Enugu-Onitsha expressway in Enugu State and exploded, killing 18 and injuring 10.
- January 26 – Bolivia – A bus overturned in Potosi Department, killing 19 and injuring nine.
- January 29 – Saudi Arabia – A bus carrying foreign workers crashed into a trailer near Jizan, killing 15 and injuring 11.
- February 1 – Nigeria – Two buses collided on the Benin–Ore–Sagamu Expressway in Odigbo before catching fire, killing 30 and injuring two.
- February 8 – Mexico – 2025 Escárcega bus crash. A bus collided with a truck before catching fire near Escárcega, killing 41 and injuring eight.
- February 8 – South Africa – A bakkie and a minibus taxi collided head on in Kapama, killing 13.
- February 10 – Guatemala – 2025 Guatemala City bus crash. A bus fell off of a bridge over the Las Vacas River in Guatemala City, killing 55 and seriously injuring nine.
- February 11 – Ethiopia – A bus overturned in East Welega Zone, killing 26 and injuring 42.
- February 13 – Zimbabwe – A bus collided with a truck near Beitbridge, killing 24 and injuring 30.
- February 13 – Nigeria – A truck fell into an overpass in Kano, killing 23 and injuring 48.
- February 14 – India – An SUV collided with a bus in Prayagraj, killing 10.
- February 15 – Pakistan – A bus carrying pilgrims overturned in Khairpur District, killing 12 and injuring 15.
- February 17 – Bolivia – A bus fell into a precipice in Yocalla Municipality, killing 31 and injuring 14.
- February 20 – Brazil – A bus carrying university students collided with a truck near Nuporanga, killing 12 and injuring 21.
- February 22 – Nigeria – A bus crashed into a petrol tanker in Niger State, killing 14 and injuring six.
- February 26 – Thailand – A tour bus overturned and fell into a ditch in Prachinburi province, killing 18 and injuring 23.
- March 1 – Bolivia – Two buses collided near Uyuni, killing 37 and injuring 39.
- March 3 – Bolivia – A bus was hit by a truck and fell off a ravine in Lenas, Potosí Department, killing 31 and injuring 22.
- March 3 – Egypt – A minibus and a truck collided head-on in Asyut, killing 13.
- March 10 – Mexico – A bus flipped over on the Mitla-Tehuantepec Highway in Oaxaca, killing 18 and injuring 29.
- March 10 – Mexico – A bus collided with a tractor near Velardeña, Durango, killing 14 and injuring 10.
- March 11 – South Africa – A bus overturned near O. R. Tambo International Airport, killing 16 and injuring 35.
- March 12 – Bolivia – A bus crashed into a rock and veered off a road in Potosí Department, killing 13 and injuring 20.
- March 14 – Kenya – A trailer rammed into a shuttle in Migaa, killing 14.
- March 23 – Mexico – A van fell into a ravine before catching fire in Santiago, Nuevo León, killing 12 and injuring four.
- April 2 – Bangladesh – A microbus collided head-on with a bus in Lohagara Upazila, Chittagong, killing 10 and injuring three.
- April 5 – Kenya – Three vehicles collided in Bomet County, killing 15 and injuring 14.
- April 8 – Brazil – A bus overturned in Araguari, killing 11.
- April 15 – Pakistan – A passenger van and a trailer collided on the Indus Highway near Methakhel, killing 10.
- April 17 – Ghana – A bus overturned in Central Gonja District, killing 10.
- April 22 – Pakistan – A truck carrying passengers fell off a ravine in Jamshoro District, killing 13 and injuring 20.
- April 22 – Ghana – A fuel tanker and a bus collided head-on near Amanase, killing 11.
- April 27 – India – A van veered off a road and plunged into a well in Madhya Pradesh after colliding with a bike, killing 12 and injuring four.
- May 1 – Philippines – A five-vehicle collision at the queue for the Tarlac City toll plaza of the Subic–Clark–Tarlac Expressway killed 10 and injured 37.
- May 3 – South Africa – A minibus taxi and a bakkie collided head-on in the Eastern Cape, killing 15.
- May 6 – Indonesia – A bus overturned near Padang, killing 12 and injuring 23.
- May 7 – Indonesia – A dump truck collided with a minibus in Purworejo, killing 11.
- May 11 – Sri Lanka – A bus fell off a cliff near Kotmale, killing 21 and injuring 35.
- May 14 – Mexico – A tanker truck collided with two other vehicles on Federal Highway 135D near Tehuacán, killing 21.
- May 25 – Colombia – A bus carrying university students and faculty crashed on the Helicoidal Bridge in Calarcá, killing 10 and injuring 11.
- May 27 – Zimbabwe – A fuel tanker collided with a van and a truck near the Sebakwe River on the Harare–Bulawayo Highway, killing 12.
- May 30 – Libya – A vehicle carrying Sudanese migrants collided with a truck near Kufra, killing 12 and injuring two.
- May 31 – Nigeria – A bus carrying athletes from a sporting event fell off the Chiromawa Bridge along the Kano-Zaria expressway in Kano State, killing 22.
- June 3 – Mexico – A bus overturned in Hualahuises, killing 11 and injuring 17.
- June 9 – Malaysia – 2025 Gerik bus crash. A bus carrying university students collided with a car in Gerik, killing 15 and injuring 31.
- June 17 – South Africa – A bus and a truck collided in KwaZulu-Natal, killing 12 and injuring 30.
- June 21 – Lesotho – A bus heading from Maputsoe to Maseru crashed into a pile-up of vehicles, killing 11 and injuring 12.
- June 23 – South Africa – A mini-bus taxi and truck bus collided in Mpumalanga, killing 10 and injuring 24.
- June 27 – Egypt – A minibus collided with a truck in Ashmoun, killing 19 and injuring three.
- June 28 – Tanzania – Two buses collided and caught fire in Sabasaba, killing 38 and injuring 28.
- July 6 – Nigeria – A truck and a commercial vehicle carrying passengers collided along the Zaria-Kano expressway in Kano State, killing 21 and injuring three.
- July 7 – Pakistan – A minibus collided head-on with a car and overturned near Adda Sagran, killing 10 and injuring 32.
- July 8 – Cameroon – A minibus collided head on with a truck near Muyuka, killing all 18 on the minibus and injuring a 9-month-old infant.
- July 19 – Iran – A bus overturned in Fars province, killing 21 and injuring 34.
- July 21 – Russia – A bus fell into a ravine in Sakha Republic, killing 13 and injuring 20.
- July 22 – Zimbabwe – A minibus taxi and a truck collided near Chitungwiza, killing 17.
- July 25 – Peru – A double-decker bus overturned in Palca District, killing 18 and injuring 48.
- July 27 – Ivory Coast – A bus traveling from San Pedro to Burkina Faso collided with a dump truck, killing 16 and injuring 51.
- July 27 – Pakistan – A bus fell into a ditch near Balkassar, killing 10.
- July 28 – Ghana – A vehicle and a fuel tanker collided head-on in Kumasi, killing 15.
- July 29 – India – A bus crashed in Deoghar, killing 18.
- August 6 – Palestine – A truck carrying humanitarian aid overturned into a crowd in the Gaza Strip, killing 25 and injuring dozens.
- August 6 – Philippines – A mini-dump truck plunged into a ravine in Lebak, Sultan Kudarat, killing 12 and injuring 13.
- August 8 – Kenya – A bus carrying mourners from a funeral overturned and plunged into a ditch near Kisumu, killing 25.
- August 8 – Brazil – A bus and a truck collided head-on in Mato Grosso, killing 11 and injuring 45.
- August 13 – India – A pickup truck carrying devotees crashed into a parked trailer truck in Dausa district, killing 11.
- August 15 – India – A bus rammed into a stationary truck in Bardhaman, killing 10 and injuring 35.
- August 15 – Algeria – A bus fell off a bridge into the Oued El Harrach river in El Harrach, killing 18 and injuring 24.
- August 17 – Benin – A bus fell off a bridge into the Ouémé River near the main Interstate 2 road, killing 27, injuring nine and leaving 16 missing.
- August 19 – Afghanistan – 2025 Herat road crash. An overcrowded bus carrying Afghans returning from Iran collided with a truck and a motorcycle before catching fire in Guzara District, killing 79 and injuring two.
- August 27 – Afghanistan – A bus overturned in Arghandi, killing 25 and injuring 27.
- August 30 – Namibia – A police van collided with a prison bus near Mariental, killing 14 and injuring three.
- September 2 – Syria – A bus and a fuel tanker collided head-on in Al-Hasakah, killing 12 and injuring one.
- September 4 – Sri Lanka – A bus plunged off a cliff near Ella, killing 15 and injuring 18.
- September 7 – Nigeria – A tanker and a bus collided head-on in Anambra State, killing 12 and injuring eight.
- September 8 – Mexico – 2025 Atlacomulco bus crash. A freight-train collided with a double-decker bus in Atlacomulco, killing 10 and injuring 61.
- September 10 – Mexico – 2025 Iztapalapa tank truck explosion. A tanker truck carrying around 13,000 gallons of liquefied petroleum gas exploded at a highway interchange in the Iztapalapa borough of Mexico City, killing 31 and injuring 90.
- September 13 – Mexico – 2025 Merida highway crash. A collision involving three vehicles in Mérida, Yucatán, killed 15 and injured two.
- September 13 – Nigeria – A bus carrying wedding guests plunged into a river in Zamfara State, killing 19.
- September 25 – Peru – A minibus collided with two trucks in Moquegua, killing 14.
- September 26 – Pakistan – A bus overturned in Dera Ismail Khan District, killing 11 and injuring three.
- October 2 – India – A tractor trolley fell into a pond in Khandwa district, killing 11.
- October 12 – South Africa – A bus fell off a mountain pass along the N1 National Route near Louis Trichardt, killing 42 and injuring 49.
- October 14 – India – A bus caught fire in Jaisalmer, killing 20 and injuring 15.
- October 16 – Pakistan – A truck overturned in Swat District, killing 15 and injuring eight.
- October 17 – Brazil – A bus lost control, hit rocks, collided with a sand embankment and overturned on a highway in Saloá, killing 17.
- October 22 – Uganda – A pileup involving four vehicles in Kiryandongo killed 46.
- October 24 – India – A bus caught fire after colliding with a motorcycle in Kurnool District, killing 25.
- October 26 – Argentina – A bus collided with a car before plunging off of a bridge and into a stream in Puerto Iguazú, killing 13 and injuring 29.
- October 26 – Nigeria – A bus crashed en route to Kano State, killing 13 and injuring five.
- November 2 – India – A van crashed onto a parked truck in Jodhpur, killing 15 and injuring two.
- November 3 – India – A dump truck collided with 17 vehicles in Jaipur, killing 19 and injuring 40.
- November 3 – India – A bus collided with a truck near Chevella, killing 20 and injuring 24.
- November 12 – Peru – A bus collided with a pickup truck and fell off a ravine into the Ocoña River in Arequipa Department, killing 37 and injuring 13.
- November 14 – Iran – Two vehicles carrying migrants from Afghanistan overturned in Khash, killing 13 and injuring seven.
- November 17 – Saudi Arabia – 2025 Medina bus crash. A bus carrying Indian pilgrims undertaking Umrah caught fire near Medina, killing 45 and leaving one survivor.
- November 17 – Ecuador – A bus fell off a cliff in Tungurahua Province, killing 21 and injuring 40.
- November 20 – Cambodia – A bus fell off a bridge into a river in Kampong Thom province, killing 13 and injuring 24.
- November 24 – Afghanistan – A bus collided with a minivan in Shindand District, killing 10 and injuring 12.
- November 26 – Philippines – A truck collided with a van in Camalig, killing 11 and injuring four.
- November 30 – India – Two buses collided in Sivaganga, killing 10 and injuring 20.
- December 14 – Colombia – A bus fell off a cliff in Antioquia Department, killing 17 and injuring 20.
- December 15 – Iran – A bus overturned in Isfahan province, killing 13 and injuring another 13.
- December 22 – Indonesia – A bus hit a concrete barrier before overturning on the Krapyak Toll Road in Semarang, killing 16 and injuring 18.
- December 27 – Guatemala – A bus fell into a ravine along the Inter-American Highway in Cumbre de Alaska, Totonicapan Department, killing 15 and injuring 19.
- December 31 – Tanzania – A bus and a truck collided on the A7, killing 10 and injuring 27.

=== 2026 ===
- January 2 – Brazil – A truck collided with a bus in Rio Grande do Sul, killing 11 and injuring seven.
- January 6 – Ethiopia – A truck carrying emigrants overturned in Semera, killing 22 and injuring 65.
- January 9 – India – A bus fell into a 500 feet (150 m) gorge near Nahan, killing 14 and injuring 30.
- January 12 – Bolivia – A bus crashed in Santa Cruz Department, killing 11 and injuring three.
- January 17 – Pakistan – A truck fell into a canal amid heavy fog in Sargodha, killing 14 and injuring nine.
- January 17 – Pakistan – A bus overturned along the Makran Coastal Highway in Balochistan, killing 10 and injuring 36.
- January 19 – South Africa – Vanderbijlpark scholar transport crash. A truck and a school minibus collided in Vanderbijlpark, killing 14 and injuring three.
- January 20 – Nigeria – A bus collided head-on with a truck on the A232 in Edo State, killing 11 and injuring seven.
- January 22 – India – A Casspir of the Indian Army skidded off a road and fell into a gorge in Doda, Jammu and Kashmir, killing 10 and injuring 10.
- January 29 – South Africa – A truck and a school minibus collided near Durban, killing 11.
- January 31 – Togo – A semitrailer truck and a bus crashed in Centrale Region, killing 10 and injuring nine.
- February 3 – Brazil – A bus veered off a road and overturned in São José da Tapera, killing 16.
- February 5 – Nepal – A bus fell off a mountain road in Baitadi District, killing 13 and injuring 34.
- February 5 – Bolivia – A bus fell down a 100 m (330 ft) ravine in Eliodoro Camacho Province, killing 10.
- February 7 – Afghanistan – A minibus fell into a valley in Badakhshan province, killing 15.
- February 8 – Nigeria – A truck carrying passengers crashed in Gezawa, killing 30.
- February 13 – Pakistan – A multi-vehicle collision on the M9 motorway in Gadap killed 13.
- February 15 – Pakistan – A bus crashed into a trailer from brake failure on a highway in Khairpur District, killing 11 and injuring 10.
- February 19 – Egypt — Two trucks collided head-on near Port Said, killing 18 and injuring three.
- February 23 – Nepal – A bus fell into the Trishuli River in Dhading District, killing 19 and injuring 25.
- February 25 – Iraq – A pile-up on Freeway 1 killed 13 and injured five near Fallujah.
- March 8 – Togo – A truck rammed a tricycle in Kozah, killing 14 and injuring 58.
- March 12 – Bangladesh – A bus collided head-on with a microbus carrying wedding guests in Bagerhat District, killing 13 and injuring 14.
- March 15 – Angola – A bus carrying 49 passengers overturned in Cabo Ledo, killing 10 and injuring 39.
- March 23 – Peru – A tourist bus plunged into a ravine in Huarochirí Province, killing 10 and injuring 15.
- March 23 – Peru – A minibus collided with a truck in Caylloma Province, killing 13.
- March 23 – Nigeria – A tanker illegally carrying 33 passengers on the Tafa-Gujeni road in Niger State lost control and crashed, killing 10 and injuring 20.
- March 25 – Bangladesh – A bus travelling to Kushtia plunged into the Padma River as it was driving onto a ferry, killing 26.
- March 25 – India – A bus collided with a truck in Markapuram district, killing 13.
- March 28 – Kenya – A truck and a minibus collided in the Nyeri-Nyahururu road in Nyeri County, killing 15 and injuring 10.
- April 11 – India – A bus crashed into two trucks in Katihar district, killing 13 and injuring 30.
- April 13 – India – A cement mixer truck collided with a van in Thane district, killing 11.
- April 15 − Ecuador − A bus fell into a ravine in Molleturo, killing 14 and injuring 29.
- April 16 − Zimbabwe − A minibus caught fire near Bulawayo, killing 18.
- April 19 − Myanmar − A bus collided with a van in Thaton Township, killing 13.
- April 20 – India – A bus skidded off a road and into a gorge in Udhampur, killing 21 and injuring 45.
- April 22 – Nigeria – A truck carrying passengers and goods went off the road and crashed in Ewu, killing 12 and injuring 14.
- April 25 – Venezuela – A bus fell into a ravine 1,000 metres (3,300 ft) from a highway in Cardenal Quintero, killing 12 and injuring three.
- April 30 – Nepal – A jeep carrying pilgrims plunged off a cliff in Rolpa District, killing 20.
- May 1 – Namibia – A minibus and a truck crashed and caught fire on the B1 Highway south of Otjiwarongo, killing 11.
- May 1 – Mexico – A bus overturned in Amatlán de Cañas, killing 11 and injuring 31.
- May 2 – Myanmar – A truck overturned in Ottarathiri Township, killing 16 and injuring 21.
- May 5 – Zimbabwe – A bus crashed near Suswe, killing 10 and injuring 45.
- May 6 – Indonesia – 2026 North Musi Rawas collision. A bus collided with an oil tanker in North Musi Rawas Regency, killing 19 and injuring four.
- May 7 – Sierra Leone – A container truck lost control and collided into multiple vehicles on a highway in Freetown, killing 10.
- May 18 – India – A truck and a passenger van collided head-on in Lakhimpur Kheri district, killing 10.
- May 19 – India – A trailer truck crashed into a wedding minitruck in Palghar district, killing 13 and injuring 25.
- May 21 – South Africa – A minibus and a bus collided head-on on the R39 in Mpumalanga, killing 10 and injuring one.
- May 25 – Bangladesh – A truck carrying iron rods and hitchhikers overturned in Tangail district, killing 15 and wounding 10.
- May 25 – Pakistan – A minibus struck a parked bus near Mardan, killing 17 and injuring five.
- May 27 – Zimbabwe – A bus collided with a truck near Kwekwe, killing 10.
- May 30 – Afghanistan – A truck carrying returning refugees from Pakistan overturned in Laghman Province, killing 22 and injuring 36.
- June 2 – Ghana – A bus and a truck collided head-on in the Volta Region, killing 15 and injuring 25.
- June 7 – Iraq – A bus overturned and caught fire near Nasiriyah, killing 21 and injuring 19.
- June 10 – Pakistan – A van plunged into a ravine and caught fire near Khajut, killing 10 and injuring 13.
- June 14 – Ecuador – A truck collided with a pickup truck near Zapotal, Santa Elena Canton, killing 12 and injuring one.
- June 15 – Ethiopia – A bus plunged into a ravine in Amhara Region, killing 31.
- June 17 – Peru – A bus overturned and went off the road in Huánuco Department, killing 11 and injuring 15.
- June 22 – Bangladesh – A truck plunged into a ditch between Dhaka and Tangail, killing 15 and injuring 10.
- June 29 – Guinea – An unspecified vehicle collided with a cargo truck in Mamou Region, killing 15 and injuring one.
- June 30 – Sudan – A truck veered off a road in River Nile State and collided with a passenger vehicle, killing 18 and wounding one.
- July 2 – Thailand – Mukdahan Buddhist procession crash. An 11-year old boy crashed his parents' pickup truck into a Buddhist procession, killing 10 monks and injuring 10.
- July 2 – Tajikistan – A crash involving a truck and two cars on the Dushanbe-Kulob-Khorog highway near Vahdat killed 11.
- July 3 – Pakistan – A bus fell into a ravine in Zhob District, killing 40 and injuring eight.
- July 5 – Nigeria – A truck and a bus collided head-on in Ogun State, killing 10 and injuring six.
- July 13 – Ivory Coast – A bus veered off a road and plunged into the Bafing River, killing 24 and injuring 36.
- July 16 – Uganda – A school bus returning from an educational trip crashed in Kapchorwa District, killing 21.
- July 17 – Peru – A minibus fell into a 500-meter ravine in Department of Cajamarca, killing 14 and injuring five.
- July 25 – Syria – Two buses collided between al-Sukhnah and Palmyra, killing 35 and injuring 30.
- July 31 – Algeria – A bus plunged into a ravine near Boumerdès, killing 28.
- August 3 – Ghana – A multi-vehicle crash on the Accra–Kumasi Highway killed 15.
- August 3 – Uganda – A taxi van and a truck collided in Kalungu District, killing 14 and injuring four.
- August 8 – Peru – A minibus collided with a truck in Espinar Province, killing 13 and injuring six.
- August 9 – Niger – Two buses collided near Madaoua, killing 22.
- August 11 – Egypt – A truck overturned in Ismailia Governorate, killing 15 and injuring 32.
- August 11 – Ghana – A multivehicle collision on the Accra–Kumasi Expressway killed 11 and injured 13.
- August 16 – Hungary – A bus carrying pilgrims from Poland overturned and veered off the M3 into a ditch near Mezőkeresztes, killing 12 and injuring 47.
- August 19 – Brazil – A minibus collided with a truck in Ipiranga, Paraná, killing 23.
- August 28 – Zimbabwe – A minibus collided with a truck near Chivhu, killing 27.
- September 2 – Egypt – 2026 Dahab-Nuweiba bus crash. A bus accident in South Sinai Governorate killed 22 and injured 28.
- September 2 – Ghana – Two minivans collided head-on in the Greater Accra region, killing 13 and injuring five.
- September 5 – Cape Verde – Cape Verde bus crash. A bus plunged into a ravine in Fogo, killing 25.
- September 11 – Russia – A minibus hit a car and a truck in Arkhangelsk, killing 13 and injuring eight.
- September 26 – Iran – A bus overturned in Markazi province, killing 11 and injuring 24.
- October 2 – Nigeria – A multi-vehicle crash along the Hawan Kibo-Jos route in Plateau State killed 20.
- October 3 – Kenya – A multi-vehicle crash along the Nairobi–Mombasa Road in Makueni County killed 17 and injured seven.
- October 9 – Tanzania – A timber truck collided with a bus in Mkambarani, killing 28.
- October 11 – Turkey – A tour bus collided with a truck near toll booths in Akhisar, killing 11 and injuring 27.
- October 18 – India – A truck rammed into a crowd of devotees in front of a temple in Gwalior, killing 15 and injuring 40.
- October 19 – Bangladesh – A bus collided head-on with a sand-laden truck in Natore District, killing 14 and injuring 20.
- October 20 – Egypt – A bus collided with a truck near Cairo, killing 12 and injuring 30.
- October 20 – Pakistan – A bus crashed into a road divider before overturning in Punjab, killing 11 and injuring 30.
- October 23 – Pakistan – A bus collided head-on with a minibus along the N-25 National Highway in Balochistan, killing 12 and injuring 20.
- October 25 – Kenya – A bus collided with a truck on the Nairobi–Mombasa Highway near Mtito Andei, killing 24 and injuring 24.
- October 31 – Egypt – A minibus and a truck collided near 6th of October City, killing 10 and injuring 24.
- November 5 – Pakistan – A bus collided with a truck in Pakpattan District, Punjab, killing 11 and injuring 33.
- November 7 – Chile – A bus collided with a car and a truck in Valparaíso Region, killing 12 and injuring 15.
- November 10 – Bulgaria – Two pileups caused by fog along the Trakia motorway near Zimnitsa, Yambol Province killed 12 and injured 50.
- November 12 – United Arab Emirates – A 23-vehicle accident caused by a truck colliding with a car in the Emirate of Fujairah killed 14 and injured 30.
- November 13 – India – A bus collided with a truck near Kaziranga National Park in Assam, killing 24 and injuring 11.
- November 15 – Iran – A bus overturned in Ilam province, killing 12 and injuring 16.

== See also ==
- Carikaze, a term referring to the alleged phenomena of cars crashing into buildings specifically in and near Columbus, Ohio, USA
