= 2015 Argentina road accident =

Details
- Date: 14 December 2015
- Location: Rosario de la Frontera
- Country: Argentina

Statistics
- Deaths: 43
- Injured: 8

On 14 December 2015, a bus carrying Argentinian gendarmes plunged off a bridge in Rosario de la Frontera in northern Argentina, killing 43 and injuring 8. This accident became known as the gendarmes tragedy (Spanish: La tragedia de los gendarmes).

== Events ==
On 13 December 2015, Patricia Bullrich ordered the dispatch of 150 gendarmes to Jujuy. On 14 December, a convoy of three buses parted from the Mobile Detachment 5 of Santiago del Estero. When they were passing through a bridge, 20km away from Rosario de la Frontera, one of the buses overturned. 43 of the gendarmes died in the accident.

== Causes ==
The crash took place at the National Route 34, which has little maintenance and many potholes. Areas near bridges are more susceptible to collisions, as the frequent braking of heavy trucks before crossing them damages the roads even further. According to investigations, the tires of the bus blew out some yards before a bridge, which caused the driver to lose control of the vehicle.

== Reactions ==
President Mauricio Macri, who had just took office, sent his condolences to the relatives of the victims. He said that "We have to improve the country roads, so that these things don’t keep happening". The Plan Belgrano, announced a short time before, was aimed to improve the poorly maintained infrastructure at the Argentine northern provinces. He also declared a national day of mourning.

== See also ==
- List of road accidents (2010–present)
