= 2021 Mexico toll booth collision =

Deadly traffic collision in Mexico in 2021

- Date: November 7, 2021; 4 years ago
- Location: 19°17′46″N 98°52′15″W
- Cause: Brake failure
- Deaths: 19
- Injuries: 3

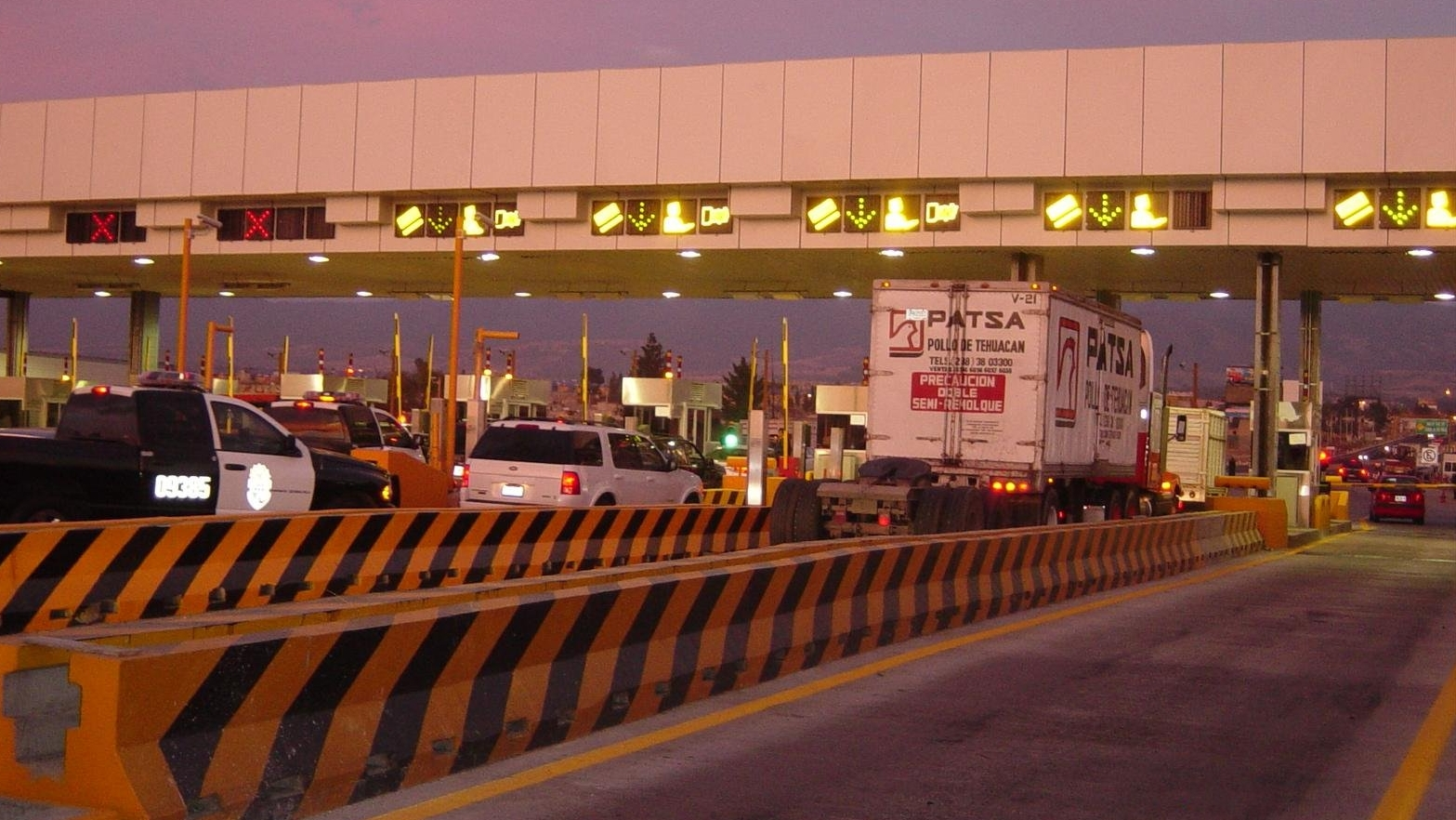
The crash occurred at San Marcos toll booth on the Mexican Federal Highway 150D.

On 7 November 2021, 19 people were killed in a large crash on Mexican Federal Highway 150D. A shampoo truck smashed into cars at a toll booth on the highway connecting Mexico City with Puebla, causing a large fire.

== Events ==
A truck travelling towards Mexico City crashed through the San Marcos Huixtoco tollbooths before colliding with many cars heading in the opposite direction. The crash precipitated a large fire that engulfed several vehicles and burned their occupants to death. The crash was caught on camera. The disaster occurred at the Plaza de Cobro San Marcos, a toll booth in the State of Mexico just east of the border with Mexico City on Mexican Federal Highway 150D.

== Investigation ==
Mexico's Federal Roads and Bridges and Related Services agency said the crash was caused by a brake failure.

== See also ==
- List of traffic collisions
- 2021 Mexico bus crash, occurred weeks later
