= 2022 Kanpur road accident =

Road incident in Uttar Pradesh, India

- Date: 1 October 2022
- Location: Kannur district, India
- Type: vehicle accident
- Deaths: 27
- Injuries: 9

On October 1, 2022, a tractor carrying pilgrims overturned and fell into a pond near Bhadeuna village in Kanpur district in Uttar Pradesh, India. 27 people died in the accident, while 9 others were injured. Most of the victims were women and children.

After the incident, the Government of Uttar Pradesh banned the use of tractor-trolleys for traveling in the state.

== Background ==
According to the 2019 annual report of India's Ministry of Road Transport and Highways, Kanpur is the fifth-highest road accident fatalities and the highest crash severity in India. In September 2022, ten people died as a tractor-trolley carrying 47 fell into a pond in Itaunja town of Lucknow.

== Accident ==
A tractor-trolley carrying 40 or 50 passengers was on to Ghatampur after attending a Mundan ceremony at the Chandrika Devi temple in Fatehpur. The tractor-trolley overturned and fell into a pond leading to the deaths of 27 people and many injured. The accident survivors alleged that the driver was drunk and speeding. The accident occurred near Bhadeuna village, in the Kanpur district, under the Saadh police station.

== Response ==
Prime Minister Narendra Modi, President of India Droupadi Murmu and Chief Minister of Uttar Pradesh Yogi Adityanath have expressed grief over the incident. The Indian government has announced an ex-gratia amount of ₹2 lakh each to the next of kin of the deceased and ₹50,000 for the injured.

The Uttar Pradesh Police and district administration in the state ran a ten-day special drive against traveling in tractor-trolleys and other goods carriers. The government also issued a circular mentioning penalty of ₹10,000 for those who found using tractor-trolleys for traveling purposes.

== See also ==
- Traffic collisions in India
