= 2016 Ghana bus collision =

Traffic collision between a truck and bus in Ghana

Ghana road accident

Details
- Date: 18 February 2016
- Country: Ghana

Statistics
- Deaths: 53
- Injured: 23 (including 5 children)

At least 53 people were killed and 23 others injured in a head-on collision between a bus and a truck in Ghana on 18 February 2016. Five children were among the wounded. The government-operated bus was heading to Tamale when it collided head-on with the cargo truck, which was carrying tomatoes, near the town of Kintampo on Wednesday evening. A regional police spokesman said: “It was very serious ... we had to use chainsaws to cut through parts of the mangled bus to get bodies and survivors out. The police affirmed it was one of the worst road accidents in Ghana in years. Even if the cause of the accident is unknown, some sources said that it could have been a problem of brakes, but speeding could also have been the cause. It seems the bus was overloaded, carrying more than the maximum of 63 passengers.

== See also ==
- List of road accidents (2010–present)
