= 2018 Pasamayo bus crash =

Traffic accident in Ancón, Peru

- Pasamayo (Peru)

Details
- Date: 2 January 2018; 12:00 (UTC-5)
- Location: Pasamayo, Peru
- Incident type: Cliff plunge
- Cause: Under investigation

Statistics
- Passengers: 57
- Deaths: 51
- Injured: 5

Around 12:00 (17:00 UTC) on 2 January 2018 a Peruvian bus carrying 57 passengers from Huacho to Lima went over a cliff after being struck by a tractor trailer near Pasamayo, Peru, killing 51 people and injuring at least 5 others. It is the deadliest road accident in Peruvian history, tied with the 2013 Santa Teresa bus disaster and 1989 Jauja bus disaster. The crash occurred near the 'Devil's Curve' highway, a precariously nicknamed route that is known for fatal traffic accidents.

== Accident ==
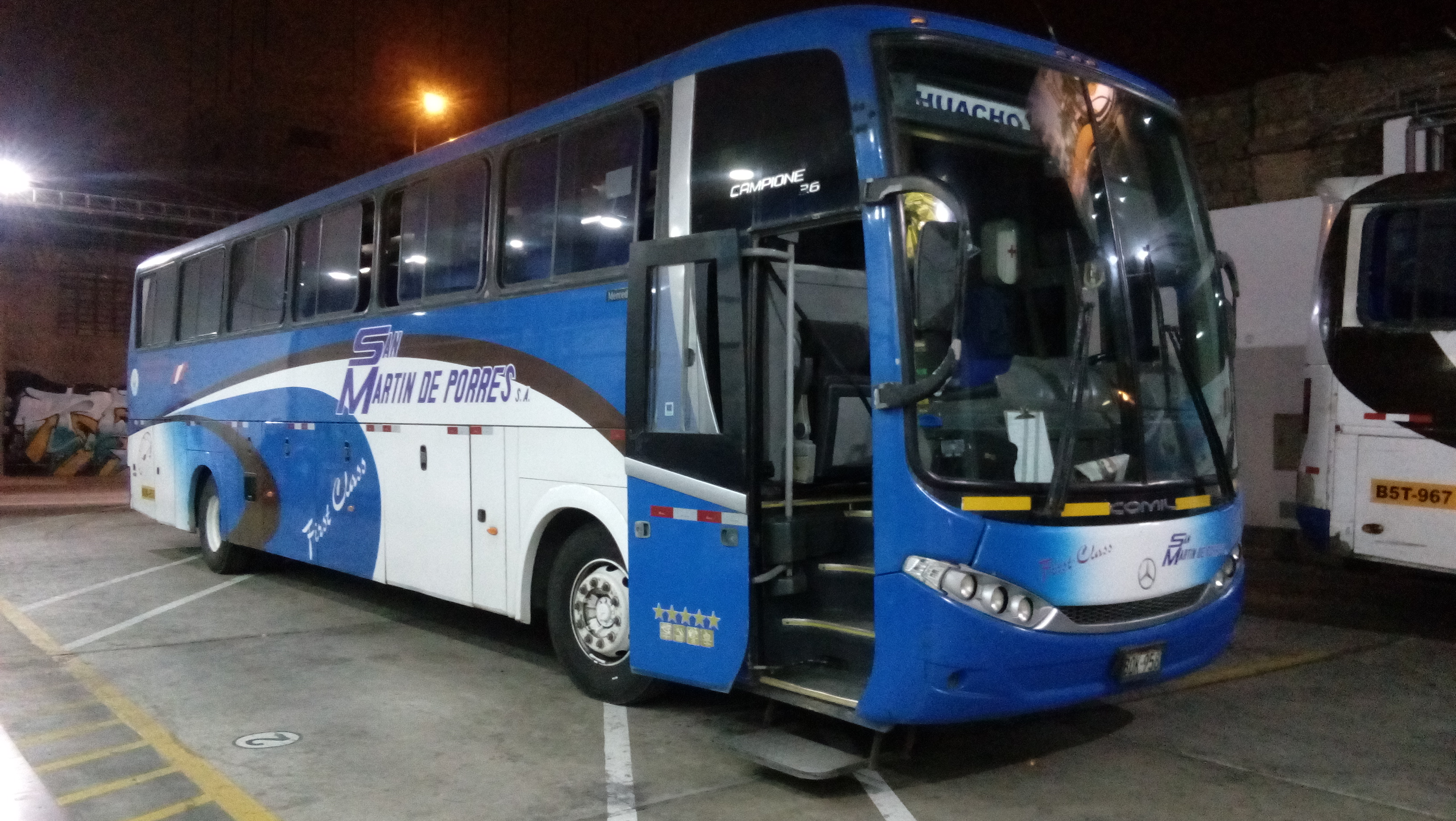
A bus from the San Martin company, similar to the one in the accident.

Peruvian Transportation Minister Bruno Giuffra stated on Twitter that both vehicles were in "excess of speed" when the accident occurred shortly before noon. The area of the crash, which is 43 kilometers from Lima, was an isolated, rocky beach below the Devil's Curve not readily reachable by roadways. The route the accident occurred on, the Devil's Curve, received its nickname from treacherous conditions created by frequent fog, a lack of barriers, and its unpredictable shape.

When the bus fell during the accident, the particular cliff it was knocked off was 260 feet (79 m) high. The crash was reportedly very violent, with many passengers being thrown outside of the bus and 12 of the deceased not being immediately removable from the vehicle. Five individuals were airlifted to hospital after emergency crews managed to extract them from the wreckage.

As a result of the accident, Peru banned buses on Devil's Curve.

== See also ==
- List of road accidents 2010–19
