= Carikaze =

Phenomenon of cars hitting buildings in Columbus, U.S.

Carikaze (a portmanteau of "car" and "kamikaze") is a term to refer to the frequent reports and alleged phenomena of vehicles unintentionally or recklessly crashing into buildings specifically within Columbus, Ohio, and its neighboring suburbs.

The phenomenon was first documented in 2019, though notably increased in the 2020s. Since 2022, there have been over 180 instances of cars crashing into buildings in or near the Columbus area. Locals have created Instagram pages to document accidents in the Columbus area. A November 2019 publication of Columbus Monthly ranked the incidents involving cars crashing into buildings in Columbus, noting the prevalence of such accidents.

== Notable incidents ==
- November 3, 2022 - Three different cars crashed into buildings on the same night, injuring three people.
- January 3, 2025 - A car crashed into the Vow Studio Salon on West 5th Avenue, causing no injuries. The "Columbus Carikaze" Instagram account posted about the accident, writing “New year, new crash”.

== See also ==
- List of traffic collisions (2000–present)
