= 2025 Medina bus crash =

Road incident in Saudi Arabia

Details
- Date: 17 November 2025
- Location: Highway 15, Medina
- Country: Saudi Arabia
- Incident type: Traffic collision
- Cause: Under investigation

Statistics
- Bus: 1
- Vehicles: 2
- Passengers: 46
- Deaths: 45
- Injured: 1

In the early hours of 17 November 2025, 45 Indian Umrah pilgrims were killed in Medina, Saudi Arabia in a bus crash after it caught fire.

== Background ==
The passengers were travelling from Medina to the holy city of Mecca for the Umrah, a lesser pilgrimage in Islam. All of the victims were from India, including a Karnataka man who had been working in the United Arab Emirates, with most of them from two Hyderabad-based families.

Road accidents have been a major public safety issue in Saudi Arabia, recording significant casualties. According to a 2023 World Health Organization report, the country reduced traffic deaths by nearly 35% between 2016 and 2021 due to government actions.

== Crash ==
The crash happened approximately 25 kilometres (16 mi) before reaching Medina when a diesel tanker collided with the bus and the latter was engulfed by flames. Of the 45 passengers, only one survived. It is unclear if the vehicle hit the bus while it was moving or was stationary. Saudi authorities have started an investigation about the circumstances that led to the accident.

== Reactions ==
Indian Prime Minister Narendra Modi said in a post on X that he was "deeply saddened" by the accident and that Indian authorities were in close contact with officials in Saudi Arabia. The Iranian Ministry of Foreign Affairs offered condolences to the "Indian government and nation".

Hyderabad City Police Commissioner V. C. Sajjanar stated that "the tragic bus accident involving Indian pilgrims in Saudi Arabia was deeply distressing".

Chief Minister of Telangana Revanth Reddy expressed shock over the crash and said that the government is in contact with the Indian Embassy in Riyadh, while the Telangana government announced 500,000 rupees ex gratia to the families of the victims.

The Indian Consulate General in Jeddah established a camp office at the Indian Haj Pilgrims Office in Medina and helplines were activated in Hyderabad and New Delhi to assist families and ensure uninterrupted communication.

== See also ==
- List of traffic collisions (2000–present)
- Transport in Saudi Arabia
- 2024 Mmamatlakala bus crash, another bus crash with 45 fatalities and a sole survivor
