= Acayucan bus crash =

2014 road incident in Mexico

Details
- Date: 13 April 2014
- Location: Mexico

Statistics
- Deaths: 36
- Injured: 4

On April 13, 2014, shortly after midnight, a bus traveling from Villahermosa to Mexico City collided with a broken-down truck and caught fire, killing at least 36 people, all of whom were merchants from the Veracruz and Tabasco states. There were four survivors, which managed to escape the flames by exiting through the back of the bus.

The collision took place near the municipality of Juan Rodriguez Clara, which is itself near Acayucan. The bus was owned by a bus-rental company called "Turismo Huicho", and the truck was owned by a milk protein company called "Prolat". The truck had been on the shoulder of the highway prior to being hit by the bus.

Javier Duarte, the governor of Veracruz at the time, said that because the bus caught fire, it would be much more difficult to identify the victims' bodies. DNA tests were done in Villahermosa, Tabasco in order to identify the victims.

The legal representative of the bus-rental company, Marino Ramírez, said that victims would be compensated according to the law, but reiterated the truck's fault in the accident.

== Reactions ==
Mexico's president, Enrique Peña Nieto expressed his condolences to the victims' families via Twitter. Mexico's Secretariat of Communications and Transportation, Gerardo Ruiz Esparza, also lamented the accident on Twitter, writing, "My deepest condolences to the families of the people who passed away in this accident."

== See also ==
- List of traffic collisions (2000–present)
