= 2013 Mahabubnagar bus accident =

Motor vehicle incident in India

Mahabubnagar bus accident
- Location of Andhra Pradesh (pre-partition) in India

Details
- Date: 30 October 2013; 5.30 AM
- Location: NH 7, Mahabubnagar District, Telangana
- Country: India

Statistics
- Deaths: 45
- Injured: 7
- Damage: Bus

The 2013 Mahabubnagar bus accident occurred on 30 October 2013 when a private Volvo bus on the way from Bangalore to Hyderabad caught fire after hitting a culvert while overtaking a car, killing 45 people and injuring another seven. The accident took place at Palem village, Mahbubnagar district, then in Indian state of Andhra Pradesh (but after 2 June 2014 in Telangana) at 5.30 AM.

== Accident ==
The bus, which belonged to a local tour operator Jabbar Travels left Bangalore at 11 pm on 29 October, with 49 passengers on board. The accident happened when the bus driver tried to overtake a car but hit a culvert and damaged its diesel tank in the process leading to the fire. However the bus driver, cleaner and five other passengers managed to escape the bus.

== See also ==
- List of traffic collisions (2010–present)
