= 2003 East Java bus crash =

Road accident in Indonesia

Details
- Date: 8 October 2003; 22 years ago
- Location: Situbondo–Probolinggo Road, Situbondo
- Country: Indonesia
- Incident type: Road accident
- Cause: Loss of brakes leading to collision

Statistics
- Vehicles: 3
- Passengers: 54
- Crew: 2
- Deaths: 54
- Injured: 2

On 8 October 2003, a tour bus carrying mostly school children collided with two trucks near Situbondo, East Java, killing 54 people. The crash was also called Paiton bus crash or Paiton tragedy due to its location near Paiton thermal power station.

The bus was returning students to Yapemda Vocational High School in Sleman Regency, Special Region of Yogyakarta after a week-long trip to the Indonesian island of Bali. It was driving at night on a busy two-lane highway when it was hit head-on by a truck on the wrong side of the road. A delivery truck then collided with the bus from behind and the wreckage burst into flames. Passengers could not open the exit doors which had been jammed shut in the collision.

Forty-nine schoolgirls, two schoolboys, two teachers, and a tour guide died. The bus driver and his assistant were badly injured. Police officials said it was the deadliest transport accident of that year.

The truck driver and his assistant fled the scene. The assistant was apprehended the same night and the driver a few days later. The driver admitted that the unlicensed assistant had been behind the wheel and that their vehicle had been speeding, he said the brakes had failed and that they were occupying both lanes as they descended the hill.
