= 2018 North Korea bus accident =

Motor vehicle incident in North Korea

Details
- Date: April 22, 2018
- Country: North Korea

Statistics
- Deaths: 36

On 22 April 2018, a bus in North Hwanghae Province, North Korea transporting Chinese tourists fell off a bridge, killing thirty-two Chinese tourists and four North Koreans, who were organized by the Utopia. The cause of the accident was not immediately disclosed.

== Accident ==
The bus was traveling from Kaesong to Pyongyang, when the bus went off of the bridge in the North Hwanghae Province.

== Reaction ==
North Korean leader Kim Jong-un visited the Chinese embassy in Pyongyang to express his condolences regarding the accident.
