= Mazocruz =

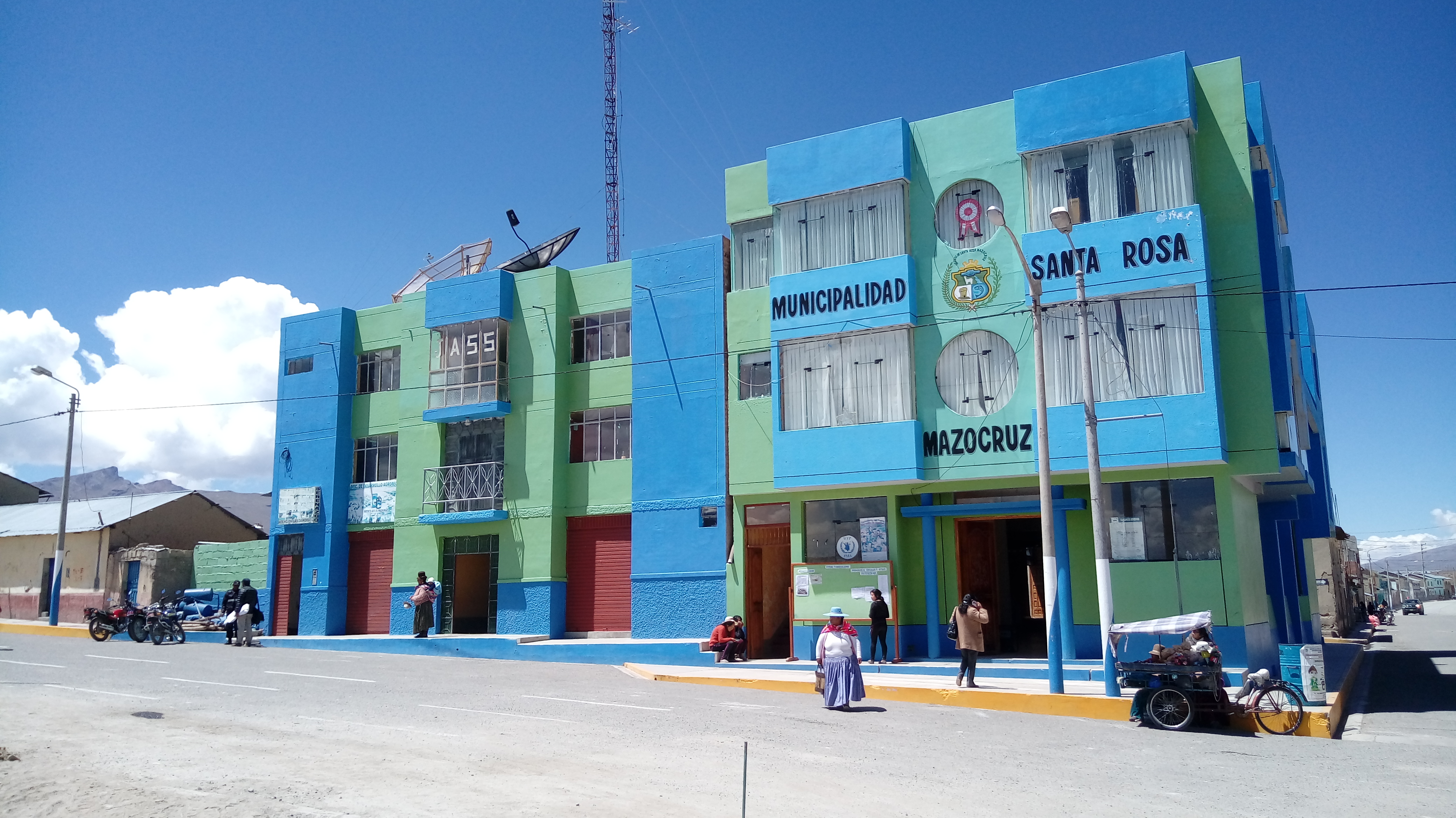

- Location within Peru
- Coordinates: 16°44′33″S 69°42′58″W
- Country: Peru
- Region: Puno
- Province: El Collao
- District: Santa Rosa District

Population (2017)
  - Total: 1,070

Mazocruz, also spelled Mazo Cruz, is a town and the capital of the Santa Rosa District in the El Collao Province, department of Puno, in the Peruvian Altiplano.

== Climate ==
Climate data for Mazo Cruz, elevation 3,980 m (13,060 ft), (1991–2020)
Month	Jan	Feb	Mar	Apr	May	Jun	Jul	Aug	Sep	Oct	Nov	Dec	Year
Mean daily maximum °C (°F)	16.0 (60.8)	15.7 (60.3)	16.0 (60.8)	16.4 (61.5)	16.2 (61.2)	15.4 (59.7)	15.1 (59.2)	16.1 (61.0)	17.2 (63.0)	18.3 (64.9)	19.0 (66.2)	18.0 (64.4)	16.6 (61.9)
Daily mean °C (°F)	8.4 (47.1)	8.3 (46.9)	7.9 (46.2)	6.2 (43.2)	3.1 (37.6)	1.2 (34.2)	1.0 (33.8)	2.1 (35.8)	3.9 (39.0)	5.6 (42.1)	6.8 (44.2)	8.2 (46.8)	5.2 (41.4)
Mean daily minimum °C (°F)	0.9 (33.6)	0.9 (33.6)	−0.2 (31.6)	−3.9 (25.0)	−10.0 (14.0)	−13.0 (8.6)	−13.1 (8.4)	−11.9 (10.6)	−9.4 (15.1)	−7.0 (19.4)	−5.3 (22.5)	−1.6 (29.1)	−6.1 (21.0)
Average precipitation mm (inches)	141.3 (5.56)	120.1 (4.73)	69.6 (2.74)	24.8 (0.98)	5.0 (0.20)	2.0 (0.08)	3.6 (0.14)	7.6 (0.30)	8.5 (0.33)	18.0 (0.71)	25.5 (1.00)	75.4 (2.97)	501.4 (19.74)
Source: National Meteorology and Hydrology Service of Peru
