= Itaunja =

- Town
- Location in Uttar Pradesh, India
- Coordinates: 27.08°N 80.92°E
- Country: India
- State: Uttar Pradesh
- District: Lucknow
- Elevation: 124 m (407 ft)

Population (2011)
  - Total: 7,305

Languages
  - Official: Hindi
- Time zone: UTC+5:30 (IST)
- Vehicle registration: UP-32

Itaunja is a town and a nagar panchayat in Lucknow district, in the Indian state of Uttar Pradesh. Itaunja have a railway station located at the outskirt of the nagar panchayat area near NH24.

== Geography ==
Itaunja is located at 27.08°N 80.92°E. It has an average elevation of 124 metres (406 feet).

== History ==
Itaunja was the seat of Itaunja Estate, a Talukdari of Oudh.
