= Benalmádena coach crash =

2008 bus accident in Spain

Details
- Date: 19 April 2008; 19:45
- Location: Benalmádena, Spain

Statistics
- Bus: 1
- Vehicles: 1
- Deaths: 9
- Injured: 38

The Benalmádena coach crash was a traffic accident on Saturday 19 April 2008 in the Málaga province in Andalusia, southern Spain. The accident happened on the highway AP-7 between Fuengirola and Torremolinos, near the town of Benalmádena, at about 19:45 local time (18:45 UTC). A 27-year-old man driving an SUV started to overtake a coach, transporting Finnish tourists to Málaga Airport. The SUV collided with the right-hand side barrier and bounced off to the side of the coach, causing the coach driver to lose control of the vehicle, which fell on its side in the middle of the highway. The SUV driver was under the influence of alcohol at the time of the accident.

Nine people died immediately in the crash and 38 were injured. Of the people taken into hospital, 11 were uninjured, 17 suffered slight injuries and one passenger was severely injured and fell into a coma. The uninjured victims were taken into a hotel. According to Spanish newspapers, the SUV driver suffered only slight injuries. Of the people in the coach, only the driver was Spanish. The others were tourists travelling on an Aurinkomatkat holiday trip and Aurinkomatkat workers. Both Aurinkomatkat guides suffered slight injuries. Of the victims, two were from Helsinki, two from Tuusula, and one each from Espoo, Kajaani, Pori, Kangasala and Tampere. The slightly injured victims were flown to Finland on Sunday evening.

The coach passengers were supposed to go on a night flight back to Helsinki-Vantaa airport at 03:30 in the morning. However, only other Aurinkomatkat passengers arrived on the Finnair plane. The surviving victims were transported to their hotels and were not flown back to Finland on the original flight. All victims were identified on 20 April. Relatives of the victims arrived on a flight arranged by Finnair and Aurinkomatkat.

The SUV driver was sentenced to 3½ years in prison and has never driven again. According to Spanish media, the crash was the worst traffic accident in Spain since 2001.
