= 2008 M6 motorway crash =

Car crash near Sandbach, England

- Date: 21 October 2008
- Time: 10:40 p.m. (GMT)
- Location: Sandbach, Cheshire, England; 53.1496°N 2.3430°W
- Type: Pile-up
- Deaths: 6

A large car crash occurred on 21 October 2008 near Sandbach on the M6 motorway in the United Kingdom. The crash, which involved three lorries and two cars, killed six people, four of which were children.

== Incident ==
A crash which occurred on the motorway earlier in the day caused the road to be closed and to have large queues.

On 20 October 2008, at around 10:40 p.m. GMT on the M6 motorway northbound south of junction 17, near Sandbach, Cheshire, a pile-up occurred.

It involved three lorries and two cars. One of the cars, a Toyota Previa, burst into flames after crashing into a Volvo lorry and getting pushed underneath it. The force of the collision reportedly separated the body of the car from the chassis.

The Toyota had a family of six inside, all of which died at the scene. It was initially thought that only five people died in the crash, however several hours later another "very small" child was found in the car, which brought the total to six.

== Investigation ==
A 46-year-old Portuguese man, Paulo Jorge Nogueria da Silva, was charged with six counts of death by dangerous driving.

On 10 February 2009, a prosecution at Chester Crown Court said that da Silva was not paying attention to the road when his lorry ploughed into the Toyota Previa with the family who was killed inside. Sergeant David Cox, motorway supervisor for Cheshire Police, was one of the first officers at the scene of the crash and spoke about how horrific the scene was. He said that the scene was so horrific that the make of the car or the number of people inside was impossible to determine. Furthermore, he said that specially trained officers had to be called to remove the remains of the dead family from the car.

Da Silva denied the six charges of causing death by dangerous driving and six alternative charges of causing death by careless driving.
