= 2023 Kericho truck crash =

Road crash in Kenya

- 2023 Kericho truck crash (Kenya)
- Date: 30 June 2023
- Location: Londiani, Kericho County, Kenya; 0°10′36″S 35°37′05″E
- Cause: A lorry carrying a shipping container veered off the road and ploughed into several vehicles
- Deaths: 52
- Injuries: 30

On 30 June 2023, a lorry carrying a shipping container went out of control and hit several vehicles, pedestrians and market traders on a road in Londiani, Kericho County, Kenya, killing at least 52 people and injuring at least 30.

== Background ==
The number of traffic collisions in Kenya has been swelling in recent years. The area of the crash site is known for having frequent road incidents.

Kenya has a road mortality rate of 27.8 per 100,000 people (per the WHO); typical for sub-Saharan Africa (where the rate is 27 per 100,000), but higher than, for example, the European Union, which has 6 deaths per 100,000 people per year. This high rate is blamed on "driver error, poor roads and decrepit vehicles." On 24 July 2022, 34 people were killed when a bus drove into a river in Tharaka-Nithi County. Kenya's National Transport and Safety Authority said that at least 4,690 people died in road accidents in Kenya in 2022.

Africa accounts for about one-fifth of the world's road deaths, despite only containing 3% of the world's motor vehicles. Africa Transport Policy Program, which works on developing transportation policies, has referred to an "epidemic of road fatalities and serious injuries." More than 270,000 people die in vehicle collisions in Africa each year, and the World Health Organization projects that figure will nearly double by 2030, in part due rapid urbanization.

== Incident ==
A lorry carrying a shipping container lost control and collided into several other vehicles, pedestrians and market traders at a busy junction in Londiani. The lorry hit minibuses, market stalls, boda bodas, and private cars. Fifty-two people were killed during the crash, making it one of the deadliest traffic collisions in Kenya in recent history. At least three people died in hospital. At least 30 people were injured, with the number possibly being even higher. Witnesses said the driver was trying to avoid a bus that had broken down on the road. Heavy rain interrupted rescue efforts. The lorry was registered in Rwanda. The Kenyan Red Cross started a blood donation drive for the injured.

== Aftermath ==
The governor of Kericho County, Erick Mutai, said "[his] heart is crushed" by the crash, while Kenyan President William Ruto said, "The country mourns with the families who have lost loved ones in a horrific road accident in Londiani". Transport minister Kipchumba Murkomen stated at a visit to the site that it was a "painful", "terrible" tragedy and promised to introduce new safety measures, with road safety awareness programmes being started, speed cameras being installed and the re-testing of public service and commercial vehicle drivers. Murkomen said the government planned to move street traders from roadside areas to designated markets to avoid similar accidents in the future. He also said to reporters that "Investigations have been launched to establish the cause of this accident but we urge drivers to be cautious and follow the rules."
