= Plan Belgrano =

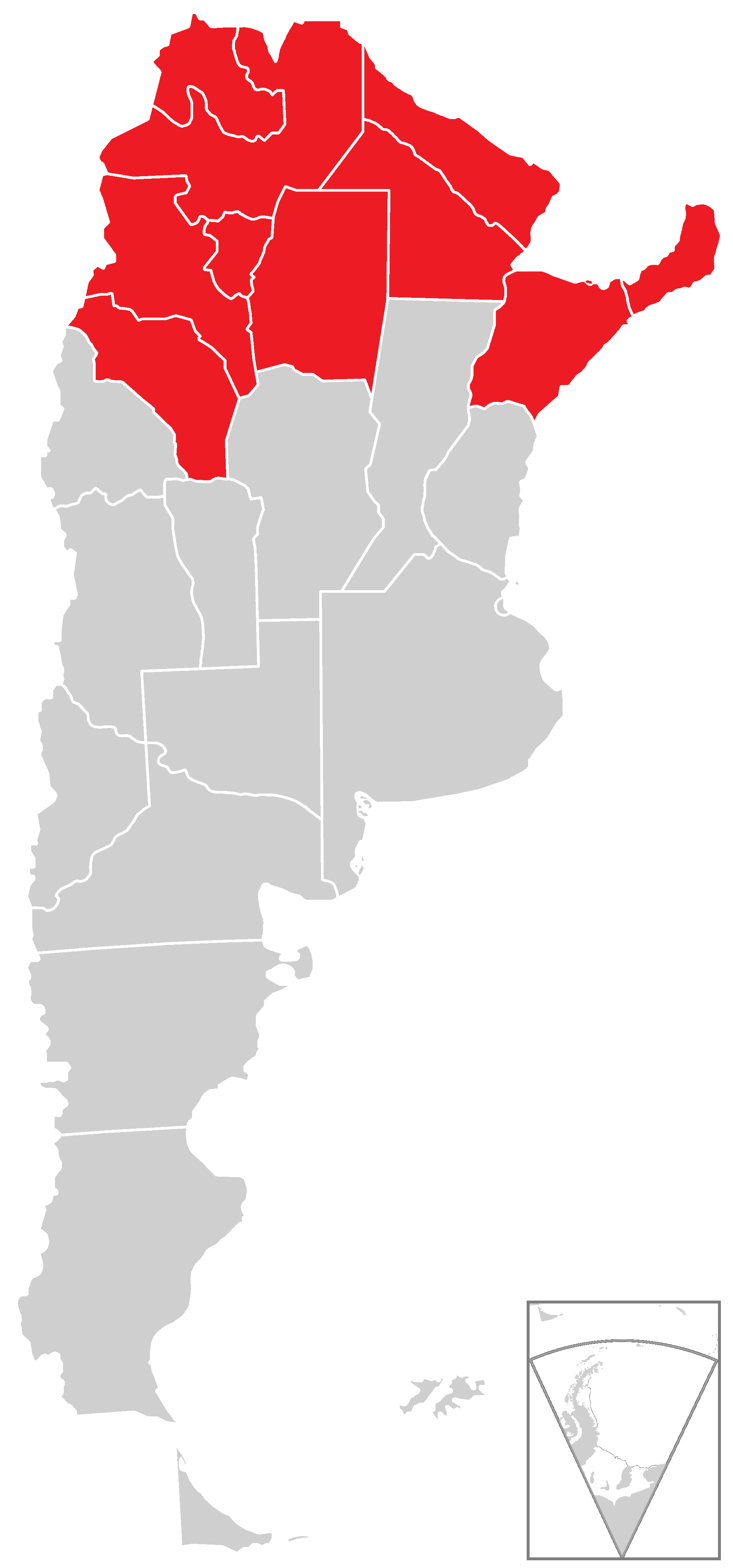
Provinces covered by the plan in red.

The Plan Belgrano, named after Manuel Belgrano, is an infrastructure plan for the northern Argentine provinces, announced in 2015 by president Mauricio Macri.

== Announcement ==
Macri has announced an infrastructure development strategy named Plan Belgrano (after Manuel Belgrano), a plan aimed at building infrastructure and encouraging industry development in ten of Argentina's northern provinces, which have historically lagged behind the rest of the country. The plan includes a proposed investment equivalent to 16 billion United States dollars over the course of 10 years, along with an "historical reconstruction fund" of 50 billion pesos to be used in 4 years. Other objectives of the plan include the provision of housing for some 250,000 families, and the construction of 1,400 child care centers.
