= Khambatki Ghat =

Coordinates: 17.0006888°N 73.7772247°E

- Interactive map of Khambatki Ghat

Location
- Location: Maharashtra, India
- Range: Sahyadri

Khambatki Ghat is a mountain pass on Pune-Kolhapur section of National Highway 48 in Maharashtra, India. This ghat lies in the Sahyadri mountain ranges (Western Ghats) and has picturesque mountain-scapes and a pleasant climate.

== Details ==
Earlier, Khabataki ghat road was two-way. A separate tunnel was built on the top of the hill which separated the Kolhapur-Pune road. The current one-way tunnel was constructed to bypass the ghat through a mountain range as an alternative to existing Khambatki ghat in Khandala tehsil of Satara district. The new road has been set up for the vehicles coming from Satara to Pune. This ghat is en route Bengaluru from Pune. People going to Panchgani and Mahabaleshwar via Pune also use this ghat. Mahabaleshwar and Panchgani are two major tourist locations followed by the Sajjangad and Kas plateau, where thousands of tourists visit every year.It is also named after a khamb(pole) in a pit
