= Port Harcourt bus electrocution =

Nigerian bus incident

Details
- Date: 13 February 2010
- Location: Port Harcourt, Rivers State, Nigeria

Statistics
- Deaths: 11
- Injured: 11

On 13 February 2010 in Port Harcourt, Rivers State, Nigeria, eleven people were killed when a power cable fell on them.

== Accident ==
At approximately 08:00 local time (UTC+1) on 13 February 2010, a road traffic incident in occurred in Port Harcourt, Rivers State, Nigeria, in which eleven people were killed. A 33 kilovolt electric cable snapped, striking two Nissan Urvan buses, and electrocuting many of the occupants. The incident occurred after a severe thunderstorm; the cable was believed to have been brought down by heavy rainfall.

== Casualties ==
The majority of the casualties were bus passengers, though several passers-by were also struck. The death toll is eleven; a further eleven having been hospitalised. Ten of the victims died in the incident or its immediate aftermath; the eleventh died in hospital on 14 February.

== Aftermath ==
There were conflicting reports on the death toll in the immediate aftermath of the incident. Eyewitnesses reported seeing as many as 40 bodies, and several sources initially put the death toll at 20. The Rivers State government released a statement in which it said that no more than 10 people had been killed, while a police spokesperson announced that 12 others had suffered "severe burns".

The state government has ordered a report from the Power Holding Company of Nigeria about why the cable was still live when it broke. The state governor released a statement which stated: "We sympathise with the families of those involved in the tragedy. We pray God to grant the souls of the departed rest and to consolation [sic] to their families. While we are not apportioning blame, we want to say that the tragedy could have been averted if the PHCN had maintained the affected facility."
