= 2018 Chongqing bus crash =

Motor vehicle accident in China

- The location in Chongqing where the incident occurred

Details
- Date: 28 October 2018; 10:02 AM China Standard Time (UTC+8)
- Location: Second Wanzhou Yangtze River Bridge, Wanzhou District, Chongqing, China
- Country: China
- Line: No. 22 Wanzhou Public Bus
- Incident type: Plunge from bridge
- Cause: Driver distracted by an altercation with passenger

Statistics
- Passengers: 14
- Crew: 1
- Deaths: 13 deaths (including both perpetrator and driver), 2 missing 15 deaths (result)
- Injured: 1 (in another car)

External videos
- Police: Chongqing Bus Tragedy Caused by Fight Between Driver and Passenger - Footage of Attack and Accident | CGTN

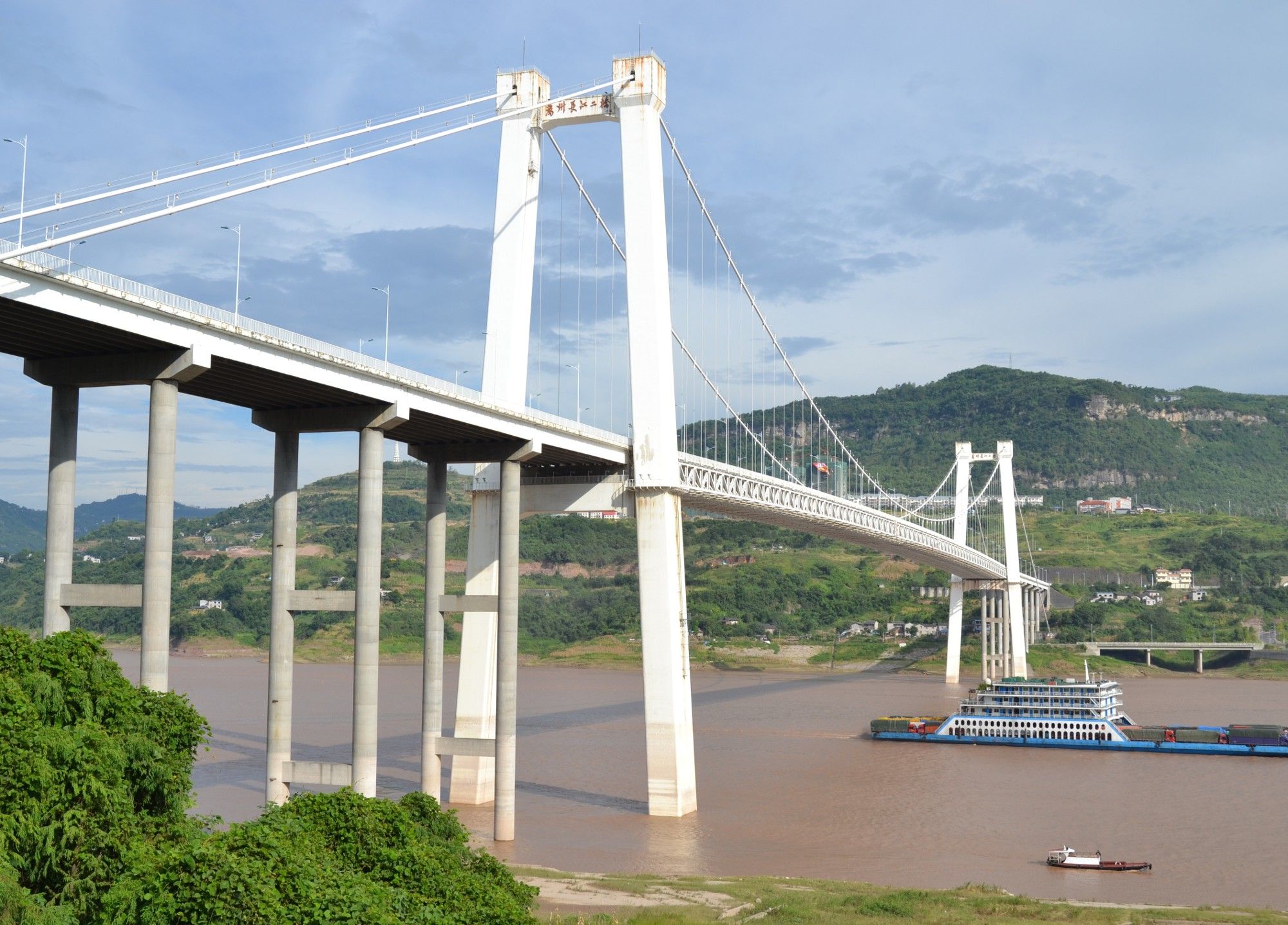
The Second Wanzhou Yangtze River Bridge, where the bus crash occurred, pictured in 2012

On 28 October 2018 at 10:02 a.m., a bus plunged 50 metres (164 ft) off the Second Wanzhou Yangtze River Bridge into the Yangtze River in Wanzhou District, Chongqing, China after a physical altercation broke out between the bus driver and a passenger. At least thirteen people died, and two are missing. It is believed that there were no survivors.

== Crash ==
At approximately 10:02 a.m., the bus, traveling at 51 km/h, turned into the opposite lane and smashed through the safety barriers on the side of the bridge before plunging into the river. Initial reports indicated that the bus had swerved to avoid an oncoming vehicle; however, footage recovered from the bus shows that a female passenger had attacked the driver, who retaliated. Local police have said the fight was the cause of the crash. Police said the pair began arguing when the driver refused to let her off the bus after she missed her stop. The footage shows the pair gesturing at each other before the woman swung at the driver with her mobile phone.

Chinese authorities were able to eventually determine what happened based on the vehicle's black-box recording, witness accounts, and surveillance videos along the bus route.

== Recovery ==
Divers recovered 13 bodies following a large rescue operation using a floating crane to recover the wreckage. Two people remain missing.

Zhao Hu, a lawyer, told Chinese state media that the families of the crash victims could seek damages from the relatives of the bus operator and the female passenger who started the fight. The police have said the passenger and the driver broke laws by endangering public safety. Zheng Chuankai, a lawyer with Anli Partners in Beijing, said the incident underscored the need to maintain strict laws to punish those who endanger public safety. "This case is very typical and very vicious," he said.

== See also ==
- 2018 Lanzhou toll accident
- 2003 Tuen Mun Road bus accident
- 2018 Hong Kong bus accident
