= Jozef Tiso =

President of the Slovak Republic from 1939 to 1945

The Reverend Jozef Tiso
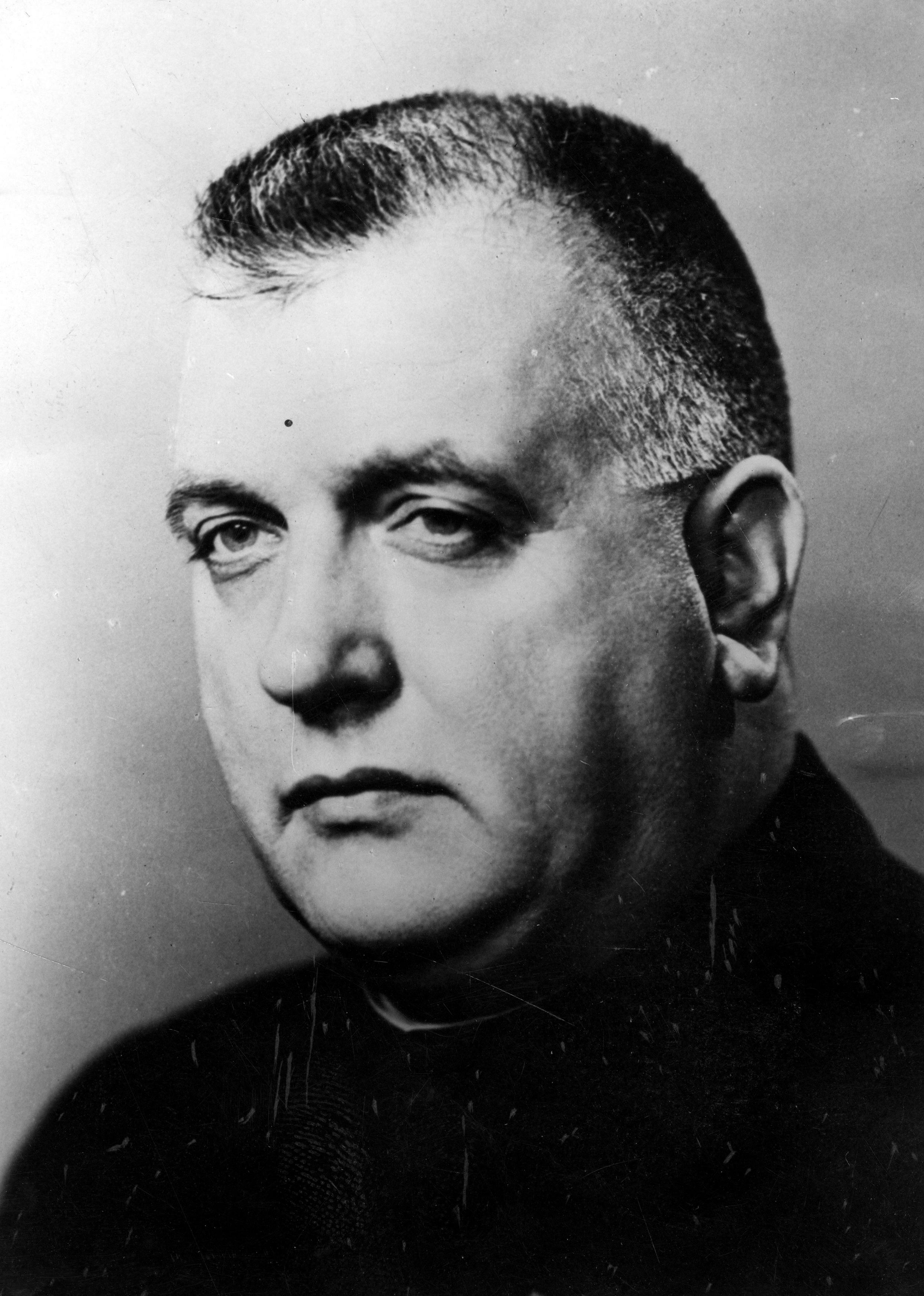
- Tiso in 1936

President of the Slovak Republic
- In office 26 October 1939 – 4 April 1945
- Prime Minister: Vojtech Tuka (1939–1944); Štefan Tiso (1944–1945)
- Preceded by: Office created
- Succeeded by: Office abolished

Prime Minister of the Slovak Republic
- In office 14 March 1939 – 17 October 1939
- Preceded by: Post created/Himself (Prime minister of the Autonomous Slovak Region)
- Succeeded by: Vojtech Tuka

Prime Minister of the Autonomous Slovak Region
- In office 7 October 1938 – 9 March 1939
- Preceded by: Position established
- Succeeded by: Office abolished

Minister of Interior, Social Care and Health
- In office 1 December 1938 – 20 January 1939
- Preceded by: Himself
- Succeeded by: Himself

Minister of the Interior
- In office 7 October 1938 – 1 December 1938
- Preceded by: Office created
- Succeeded by: Himself

Minister of Health and Physical Education of Czechoslovakia
- In office 27 January 1927 – 8 October 1929
- Preceded by: Jan Šrámek
- Succeeded by: Jan Šrámek

Personal details
- Born: 13 October 1887 Nagybiccse, Austria-Hungary
- Died: 18 April 1947 (aged 59) Bratislava, Czechoslovakia
- Cause of death: Execution by hanging
- Party: Catholic People's Party; Slovak People's Party
- Profession: Politician; Catholic priest

Jozef Gašpar Tiso (Slovak pronunciation: [ˈjɔzef ˈtisɔ], Hungarian pronunciation: [ˈjoʒɛf ˈtiso]; 13 October 1887 – 18 April 1947) was a Slovak politician and Catholic priest who served as president of the First Slovak Republic, a client state of Nazi Germany during World War II, from 1939 to 1945. He previously served as Prime Minister of the Autonomous Land of Slovakia from October 1938 to March 1939, where he then served as Prime Minister of the Slovak Republic until October 1939. After the war, in 1947, he was convicted of treason and executed in Bratislava.

Born in 1887 to Slovak parents in Nagybiccse (today Bytča), then part of Hungary, Austria-Hungary, Tiso studied several languages during his school career, including Hebrew and German. He was introduced to priesthood from an early age, and helped combat local poverty and alcoholism in what is now Slovakia. He joined the Slovak People's Party (Slovenská ľudová strana) in 1918 and became party leader in 1938 following the death of Andrej Hlinka. On 14 March 1939, the Slovak Assembly in Bratislava unanimously adopted Law 1/1939 transforming the autonomous Slovak Republic (that was until then part of Czechoslovakia) into an independent country. Two days after Nazi Germany seized the remainder of the Czech Lands, the Protectorate of Bohemia and Moravia was proclaimed.

Tiso, who was already the prime minister of autonomous Slovakia (under Czechoslovak law), became the Slovak Republic's prime minister, and, in October 1939, was elected its president. Tiso collaborated with Germany in deporting Jews, sending many Slovak Jews to extermination and concentration camps in Germany and German-occupied Poland, while some Jews in Slovakia were murdered outright. Deportations were carried out from 25 March 1942 until 20 October 1942, after the Vatican and other Catholic officials had been repeatedly denouncing and protesting the deportations. An anti-fascist partisan insurgency was waged, culminating in the Slovak National Uprising in summer 1944. After German military authorities suppressed the uprising and executed many of its leaders, Slovakia was largely occupied by Germany. Consequently, when the deportations of Jews were renewed on 30 September 1944, an additional 13,500 were deported, despite renewed Vatican condemnations.

When the Soviet Red Army overran the last parts of western Slovakia in April 1945, Tiso fled to Austria and then Germany, where American troops arrested him and then had him extradited back to the restored Czechoslovakia, where he was convicted of high treason, betrayal of the national uprising, and collaboration with the Nazis, and then executed by hanging in 1947 and buried in Bratislava. In 2008, his remains were buried in the canonical crypt of the Cathedral in Nitra, Slovakia.

== Early life ==
=== Childhood and education ===
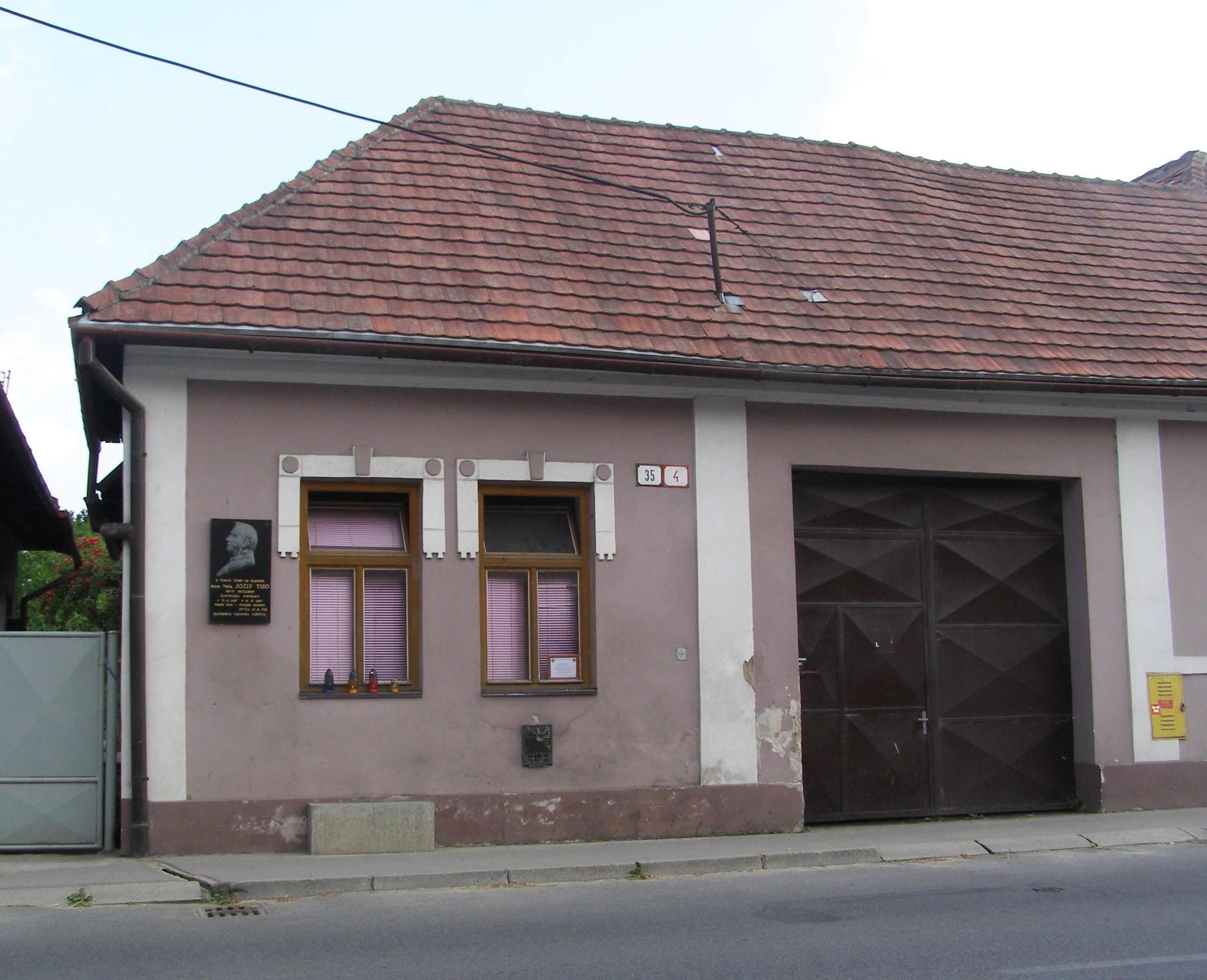
Birthplace of Tiso in Bytča, Slovakia

Jozef Tiso was born in Bytča (then Hungarian: Nagybiccse) to Slovak Latin Catholic parents, in Trencsén County, of the Kingdom of Hungary, part of the Austro-Hungarian Empire. Tiso's father, also named Jozef, was a butcher, while his mother, Terézia, came from a poor family involved in pottery. The second of seven children who survived infancy, Tiso was raised in a religious family and studied at the local elementary school. Then, as a good student with a flair for languages, he studied at a lower grammar school in Zsolna (today Žilina, Slovakia). The school had clearly Hungarian spirit, since all Slovak grammar schools were closed at the time of his study. Here, he began to use the Hungarian form of his name Tiszó József.

In 1902, he began to study at the higher Piarist grammar school in Nyitra (today Nitra, Slovakia). The Bishop of Nyitra, Imre Bende, offered him a chance to study for the priesthood at the prestigious Pázmáneum in Vienna. Tiso, taught by several elite professors, became familiar with various philosophies and the newest papal encyclicals. During these studies, Ignatius of Loyola's Spiritual Exercises became a crucial influence for Tiso, with its emphasis on self-discipline, obedience to authority, and militant attitude against spiritual and worldly enemies. Tiso also extended his language skills; along with already knowing Hungarian, German, and Latin, he studied Hebrew, Aramaic dialects, and Arabic. The school reports describe him mostly as an "excellent", "exemplary", and "pious" student. Enrolling in the Pázmáneum in 1906, he was ordained a priest in 1910 and graduated as a Doctor of Theology in 1911. Influenced by his professors Ignaz Seipel and Franz Martin Schindler, in addition to city mayor Karl Lueger, Tiso began to gravitate toward the ideas of integralism and Christian socialism during his time in Vienna.

=== Parish duties and war service ===
His early ministry was spent as an assistant priest in three parishes in today's Slovakia: Ócsad, Bán, and Rajec. Tiso was interested in public affairs and performed extensive educational and social work. During his fight against poverty and alcoholism, he may also have adopted some stereotypical and simplified views on Slovak-Jewish relations. Such views were not unusual in the contemporary society, including among priests or other people with higher education. He blamed the Jewish tavern owners for the rising alcoholism and he was also a member of a self-help association selling food and clothing cheaper than the local Jewish store. Tiso became a member of Néppárt (Catholic People's Party) and contributed to its Slovak journal Kresťan (Christian). Nevertheless, Tiso carefully distanced himself from the Pan-Slavism and Slovak nationalism of some of his peers.

During World War I, he served as a chaplain of the 71st infantry regiment of the Austro-Hungarian Army, recruited mostly from Slovak soldiers. The regiment suffered heavy losses in Galicia. Tiso got first-hand experience with horrors of war, but also with Germanisation and Russification of the local population. Tiso's military career was ended by a serious kidney illness and he was ultimately released from the military service after a month-long appointment in Slovenia. Tiso was inspired by the effective organization of the Slovenian national movement, and soon began to see himself as a Slovak. He did not return to his parish in Bánovce, but he was appointed as the Spiritual Director of the Nitra seminary by Bende's successor, Vilmos Batthyány, a "Magyar chauvinist." Tiso was also active at this time as a school teacher and journalist, publishing his war diary in The Nyitra County Review, where the he "[appeared] as a nationally reliable, fervently Catholic, and personable idealist." In his diary entries, Tiso would refer to his nationality as magyarországi (from Hungary) rather than magyar or tót (Slovak). Tiso admired the unity of the Germans and the piety of the Poles, yet he also associated Galician Jews with "filth, disorder, and fraud." Tiso's rhetoric somewhat resembled protofascism, as he perceived war as a "morally purifying" force that would awaken idealism, remove class conflict, and strengthen nationalism through a "harmonious working together of strengths." He also covered religious and educational topics, emphasizing a need for religious literature in Slovak.

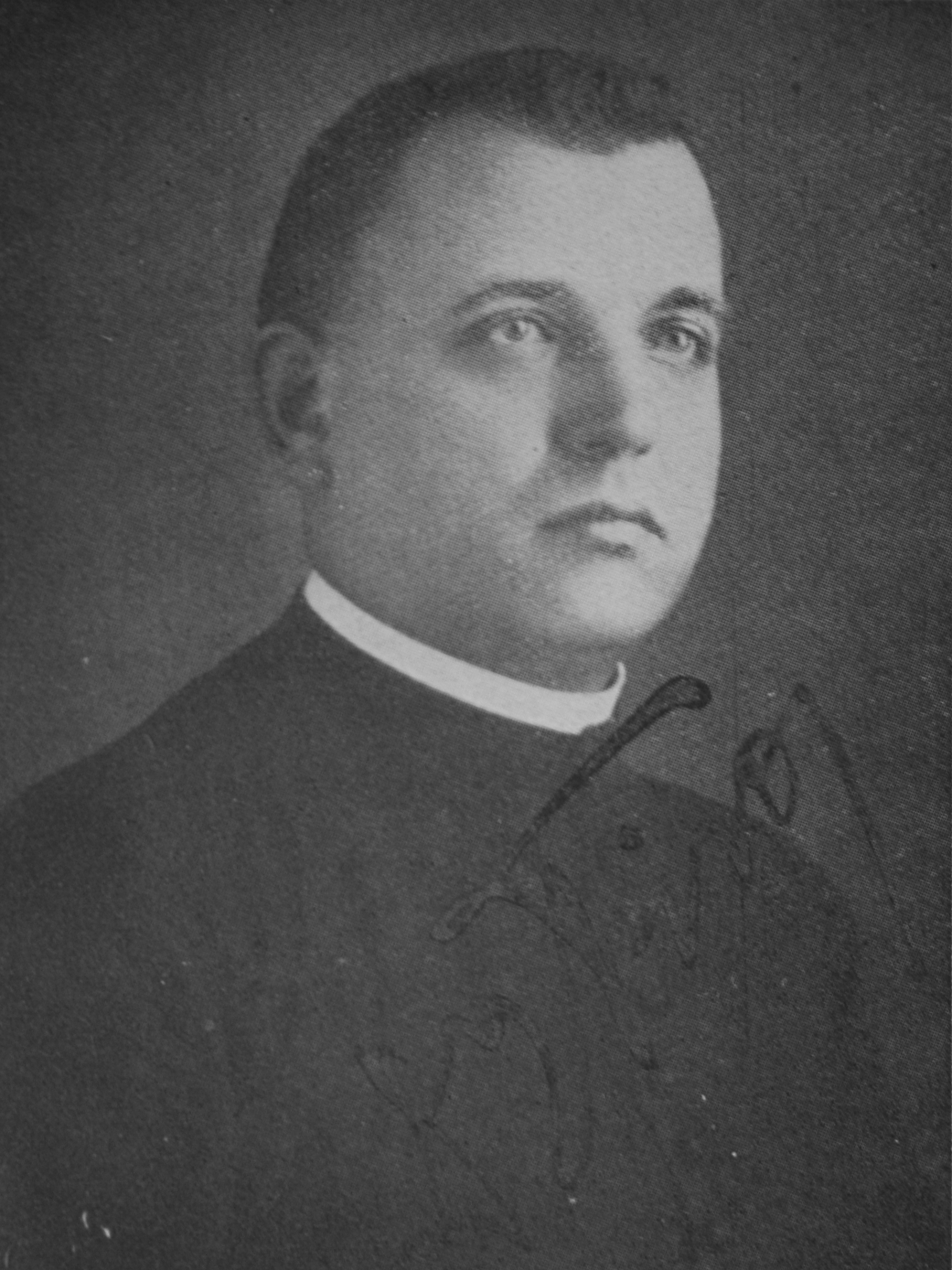
Portrait of Tiso, c. 1918

Tiso did not belong to politicians active in the pre-war national movement and his pre-war national orientation has been frequently questioned. His political opponents tried to draw him as a Magyarone (Magyarized Slovak) while some Slovak nationalists sought for proofs of his early national orientation. Tiso carefully avoided national self-categorization language, and his behaviour might be framed in a "national indifference" approach – a practice largely spread in Central Europe before 1918. In some of his pre-1918 writings, Tiso complained about the state hierarchy or the ruling Liberal party, but he never denounced the Magyarisation or the Magyar nationalism. At the same time, he was more focused on social and religious activities among the Slovaks without revealing his ethnic or national self-identification. Most importantly, Tiso publicly acted as a loyal subject of the Habsburg dynasty. More specifically, his identity was stronger linked to the entire monarchy of Austria-Hungary, than to the Kingdom of Hungary, whose citizen he formally was.

Characterized by biographer James Mace Ward,

Rather than an enthusiastic Magyar, Tiso was more likely a patriotic Hungarian. Rather than a secret pan-Slav, he was someone who was attracted to Slovak social causes yet unwilling to jeopardize his career over them. Virtually all of Tiso's actions before 1917 can be understood as defending Catholicism and the Hungarian state. It is also clear that he was drawn to agendas of progress for the country and for the weaker social classes. In the western Felvidék, these social groups tended to speak Slovak.

=== Collapse of Austria-Hungary ===
In the autumn of 1918, Tiso recognized that the Austro-Hungarian monarchy was unsustainable. He also understood that the historical Kingdom of Hungary could not be preserved anymore. Regardless of the formal Czechoslovak declaration of independence, the incorporation of Slovak territories into the new Czechoslovak state was not straightforward. Tiso and many citizens of Nitra suspected that Czechoslovak forces would invade; in these conditions, he began to prepare his readers for the new state and political regime. The primary enemy of Tiso and his Slovak Catholic allies were the anticlerical Social Democrats, whose leaders, such as László Matyuga, called for class revolution and an active resistance against Czechoslovak occupation. Tiso, in turn, would attack the leadership of the "godless" Social Democrats as "genuine, unadulterated hook-nosed Jews." On 8 December 1918, the Hungarian National Council in Nitra delegated him to negotiate with the Czechoslovak Army; two days later, the troops occupied the city. Tiso was named secretary of new Slovak National Council and embraced politics as a career, where he would frequently clash against Hungarian irredentists.

== Political activist in the First Czechoslovak Republic ==
=== Slovakization campaign and early antisemitism ===
In December 1918, Tiso became a member of the restored Slovak People's Party (Slovenská ľudová strana, so called "Ľudáks"). The party supported the idea of parliamentary democracy, defended interests of its Slovak Catholic voters, and sought Slovak autonomy within the Czecho-Slovakia framework. Tiso, largely unknown before the coup, gradually strengthened his position in the party hierarchy. His elite education, high intelligence, energy, large working experiences with common people, and his ability to speak in common terms made him a popular speaker and journalist of the party.

"We always imagined freedom thus, that there would not be in the villages any Jewish tavern owners or shopkeepers, those tenants of the sinful last government and herders to the devil....Make order in all of Slovakia so that not only will they disappear, but also the present poverty and shortages, which can be defrayed by their property, unjustly gained during the war through usury....Liberate us from this Jewish hegemony....When we will be able to govern ourselves alone, to do what we want and to want what is necessary and beneficial for us, then we will have full, golden freedom!"

— Jozef Tiso, advocating for the expulsion of Slovak Jews and the expropriation of their property in his newspaper Nitra, February 1919

While pejoratively labeled by some intra-party critics as a "new" Slovak (i.e. someone who did not embrace Slovak nationalism prior to 1918), Tiso was fiercely committed to the process of Slovakization in Nitra, where he coordinated local schools to promote Slovak literature and music, teach the Slovak language, and emphasize the view that "Slovak national consciousness inevitably entailed the adoration of God." In 1919, he founded a subsidiary of the party in Nitra and he organized a gymnastic organization, Orol (Eagle), the counterweight of a similar Czech organization, Sokol. While combating the influence of Hungarian political parties in Nitra, the anti-leftist Tiso continued to attack the Social Democrats and Jews, whom he claimed worked hand in hand, in his newspaper, Nitra.

In spring 1919, Tiso felt vindicated when the Hungarian Social Democrats brought the Jewish Béla Kun and his fellow Communists (a disproportionate proportion of whom were also Jewish) to power in Hungary. When Kun's Hungarian Soviet Republic invaded and established the Slovak Soviet Republic in June, Tiso fled northward, fearing that the communist forces would conquer Nitra and execute him if captured. The Hungarians, however, withdrew, and Tiso returned to Nitra within a week. Shortly thereafter, Tiso shut down Nitra, as "its mission of securing the city for Slovakia [had been] accomplished." Tiso would not address the "Jewish Question" again until 1938, as his principal enemy during the interwar period became the Czech establishment, which leaned toward secularization and liberal progressivism.

=== Transition to moderate politics and conflict with Czech centralists ===
Tiso first ran for parliament in the 1920 Czechoslovak parliamentary election. Although the electoral results from his district were bright spots in what was otherwise a disappointing election for the Ľudáks, the party did not reward him with a legislative seat. Tiso, however, easily claimed one in the 1925 election, which also resulted in a breakthrough victory for the party. Until 1938, he was a fixture in the Czechoslovak parliament in Prague.

In 1921 Tiso was appointed Monsignor by the Vatican, although this appointment lapsed with the later death of Pope Benedict XV. From 1921 to 1923, he served as the secretary to the new Slovak bishop of Nitra, Karol Kmeťko. During the same period, nationalist political agitation earned Tiso two convictions by the Czechoslovak courts for incitement, one of which resulted in a short incarceration. Displeased, Kmeťko dropped him as secretary in 1923, but retained him as a professor of theology. In 1924, Tiso left Nitra to become dean of Bánovce nad Bebravou, in some sense exiled from Nitra for his polarizing political activism. He remained the dean of Bánovce for the rest of his political career, returning there regularly every weekend also as a Czechoslovak minister, and later as president.

In the interwar period, Tiso was a moderate politician and his ability to reach compromises made him a respected mediator of the party. He used more radical rhetoric as a journalist, yet he put aside much of the anti-Jewish rhetoric of his earlier journalistic activities. However, he usually returned to rational, pragmatic arguments in official political negotiations. Strongly associating the Slovak identity with the Catholic faith, Tiso sharply criticized the anti-clericalism of Tomáš Masaryk and other such Czech "centralists." While the party still operated within a democratic framework, Tiso's colleague and political rival Vojtech Tuka formed two internal movements to oppose the state or its regime – the first collaborating with Hungarian irredentism and the second led by pro-fascist Rodobrana. Tiso did not participate in these.

=== Government minister and party troubles ===
In the late 1920s, Tiso became one of the party's leaders. When the president of the party Andrej Hlinka traveled in 1926 to the 28th International Eucharistic Congress in Chicago, he delegated Tiso to represent him in the presidium of the party. In his absence, Tiso led complicated negotiations about an entry of the Ľudáks into the government. In spite of pushback from "old" Slovaks within the party, Tiso was successful in reaching a coalition deal, arguing to his critics that "entering the government is the only way that autonomy will fall like a ripe fruit into the hands of Slovaks." In January 1927, he became the Czechoslovak Minister of Health and Physical Education, a minor position (using only 1.5% of proposed 1928 government spending) that had the duties of "managing state hospitals and regulating medical and food industries...[overseeing] the republic's lucrative spas and [promoting] sports through organizations like Sokol and Orol. While Tiso's ministerial activities built up goodwill with local communities, Tiso was criticized by both Czech centralists, who saw him as "incompetent" and "mixing religion with politics", and party radicals, who felt that his activities did very litle to advance the cause of Slovak autonomy."

Tiso and the Ľudáks fell out of favor with the central government in the aftermath of the "Tuka affair," where Tiso, Hlinka, and other party figures ostensibly defended the radical Tuka, who was tried and eventually sentenced to 15 years' imprisonment for anti-Republic treason charges. Tiso resigned his position on 8 October 1929, as the party sought to reenter the opposition.

In 1930, he became the official vice-president of the party and seemed destined to succeed Hlinka, whose health was deteriorating. He spent the 1930s competing for Hlinka's mantle with party radicals, most notably the rightist Karol Sidor. In 1930, Tiso published The Ideology of the Hlinka's Slovak People's Party explaining his views on the Czech-Slovak relationship. Notably, he claimed sovereignty of the Slovak nation over the territory of Slovakia and indirectly suggested the right of Slovaks also to adopt different solutions for things from the Czechoslovak government in Prague. He repeated the same idea in his parliamentary speeches.

"We want the administration, schools, and courts to go into the hands of Slovaks without exception and unconditionally. We want [to see] Slovaks making good in every branch of public life. Hlinka's Slovak People's Party strives to improve agriculture, to expand industry, and to develop Slovak financial institutions. We are for maintaining and developing our national culture, speech, traditions, customs, and so on. In short, we want to realize the slogan "Slovakia to Slovaks" in full measure, acknowledging the rights of other citizens. Otherwise, we are for a common Czecho-Slovak army, finances, and diplomatic service."

— Jozef Tiso, 31 March 1932

=== Push for autonomy ===
By the middle 1930s, Tiso's views shifted toward authoritarian and totalitarian ideas. He repeatedly declared that HSĽS was the only party representing the Slovaks and the only party which spoke for the Slovak nation. These claims played a significant role in the later end of the democratic regime. "One nation, one party, one leader...the party should cover all aspects of the life," Tiso declared at the party congress held in 1936. Tiso's view of Slovak autonomy continue to radicalize, drawing concern from Czech centralists. In mid-1934, Tiso was deeply disturbed by the assassination of Engelbert Dollfuss, who, like Tiso, held strong Catholic beliefs. In this period, Tiso returned to more moderate positions. He proclaimed that "Hitlerism and Mussolini's fascism must recognize that God is a greater power than man and that the Church is greater than the state," denounced the Gleichschaltung, the idea that war "could bring economic, social and biological rebirth" and "extreme, chauvinist nationalism," and expressed tolerance towards minorities: "A healthy love of nations has as a correlative the love of other nations, of neigbours." At the same time he grew more sceptical to liberalism and socialism as "bankrupt" systems too tolerant to "foreign elements, hostile to the state." He was hinting at repudiating electoral democracy which could present only a "technical majority", something that "must kneel before" "national unity" as a "moral force."

The 1935 Czechoslovak parliamentary election failed to provide the Ľudáks a breakthrough, and Tiso feared that the rapid success of Konrad Henlein's Sudeten German Party would remove attention from the "Slovak Question." The Agrarian prime minister Jan Malypetr offered the Ľudáks two cabinet positions (having rejected Tiso's 32-point demands for joining an anti-Henlein, pro-Republic coalition), but Tiso turned down the proposal. After Masaryk resigned the presidency in late 1935, Tiso was crucial in mobilizing his party's support for Edvard Beneš against Bohumil Němec; though Beneš won the election, the Ľudáks remained alienated. Within the party, Tiso was beginning to feel his power challenged by Karol Sidor (whom Hlinka favored as his future successor) and the radical, antisemitic youth wing. To counter this, Tiso approved the appropriation of fascist symbols and the formation of the Hlinka Guard, the "brainchild" of Alexander Mach.

In 1938, with increasing pressure from Nazi Germany and Hungary, the representatives of HSĽS questioned neighboring states on their views for the future of Slovakia. In May 1938, Tiso held secret negotiations with the Hungarian Foreign Minister Affairs Kálmán Kánya during a eucharistic congress in Budapest. He declared that Slovakia might be prepared to rejoin Hungary as an autonomous federal state should Czechoslovakia cease to exist. However, the meeting did not go well. Tiso was disappointed by Kánya's attitude and alleged Hungarian historical claims on Slovakia and felt Kánya's behaviour was lofty and arrogant. He concluded that Hungary was not seriously interested in a common agreement and was focused more on the dissolution of Czechoslovakia, as was Germany. Therefore, well aware of the weak economic position of Slovakia, the lack of qualified people and an unstable international situation, he felt he was stuck with Czechoslovakia for the time being. When Hlinka died in August 1938, Tiso quickly consolidated control of the Ľudák party. Tiso was an official speaker from the party at Hlinka's funeral where he urged national unity and loyalty to the Czechoslovak republic. He, however, continued negotiations with the central government in Prague, explained the goals of potential autonomy and refused a military solution of the Czechoslovak-German crisis.

== Autonomous Slovak Region ==
In October 1938, following the Munich Agreement, Germany annexed and occupied the Sudetenland, the main German-speaking parts of Czecho-Slovakia. On 6 October 1938, HSĽS took advantage of the weakening of central government and, in collusion with other Slovak parties, declared autonomy for Slovakia in the Žilina Agreement. The next day, he became Prime Minister of the Slovak Autonomous Region. Tiso had effectively squashed the Ľudák faction calling for outright independence, and thus ostensibly strengthened his loyalty for the Czecho-Slovak Republic; Tiso recognized that the fragile republic was still vulnerable to German, Hungarian, and Polish aggression. In addition, Tiso's new role empowered him to consolidate control within the party.

One of his first tasks was to lead the Czechoslovak delegation during negotiations with Hungary in Komárno preceding the First Vienna Award. Prime Minister Tiso, who had never led a delegation in similar international negotiations, found himself in a difficult position. The central government of the Second Czechoslovak Republic, under the pressure of terrorist actions sponsored by the Hungarian government and after serious changes of the international situation, accepted negotiations before being completely ready, and the government also found itself overloaded while trying to stabilize the situation with Germany. Tiso opposed the proposals of the Hungarian delegation but acted as a flexible and patient negotiator. When the Hungarian delegation refused further discussion, Tiso sought the help of Germany through Joachim von Ribbentrop. Later, Tiso was shocked by the First Vienna Award, so much so that he initially refused to sign the protocol. The devastated Tiso was described by peers as "on the verge of collapse [and] approaching hysteria....From his behavior, one could see very clearly that he [took] the situation not only as a hard blow to the nation but also as a personal defeat, for which he was unprepared." In a radio speech to the citizens, Tiso blamed the Prague government and its "policies of the past twenty years" for the result.

Angered yet taking solace in the fact that Slovakia was spared from complete partition, Tiso re-adopted political antisemitism. The day before the award, police arrested several Jews at a demonstration of the Hungarian Youth Organization calling for the cession of Komárno to Hungary. Their participation was then used in propaganda blaming the Jews for the result (Nazi Germany and Fascist Italy obviously did not carry out "the wish of the Jewry" but followed their own interests). On 3 November 1938, Tiso met with Jozef Faláth (the head of the "central office for the Jewish question" who had already contacts to Nazi Party politicians in Vienna) and Jozef Kirschbaum. Tiso, who was otherwise a relatively pragmatic politician, adopted an unusually firm solution. On 4 November 1938 he ordered the deportation of Jews "without property", and later those without citizenship, to the territory now annexed by Hungary. His government then deported more than 7,500 people including elderly people, pregnant women, and at least 570 children under age 15 to no man's land in rainy autumn weather. On 7 November, he cancelled the action.

In the aftermath of the Vienna Award, Tiso embarked on the process of Gleichschaltung in "New Slovakia." In November 1938, he merged (through intimidation and demoralization tactics) numerous Slovak parties into the Ľudáks, creating "Hlinka's Slovak People's Party – Party of Slovak National Unity." As a prime minister and minister of the interior of the autonomous government, Tiso had extensive powers, forbidding the activities of all political parties except those that agreed to join the governing coalition "voluntarily" and two parties representing minority populations, the German Party and the Unified Hungarian Party. HSĽS then organized rigged parliamentary elections. Even before the official announcement of the elections, Tiso told the German newspaper Völkischer Beobachter that there would be only one united ballot and Jews could not be elected. The deportations and some other actions of Tiso's autonomous government were against the Czechoslovak Constitution of 1920.

== Slovak secession ==
Standard for Tiso as Slovak President, adopted 21 July 1939

Tiso initially sought to distance Slovakia from German influence, but with his nation's underdeveloped economy facing a budget deficit of one billion crowns and relations with the central government in Prague deteriorating, Tiso gradually pursued economic talks with Germany. Coincidingly, Adolf Hitler sought to use Slovakia as a tool to destroy the Czechoslovak Republic. In February 1939, Tiso entered into negotiations with Germany for a fully independent Slovakia, separated from Czechoslovakia. He held direct meetings with the German representative Arthur Seyss-Inquart, in which Tiso initially expressed doubts as to whether an independent Slovakia would be a viable entity. Czech military units subsequently occupied Slovakia and forced Tiso out of office on 9 March. However the Ruthenians, also resentful of the inclusion of their lands in Czechoslovakia, and the oppressions of the Prague government, now also sought autonomy.

Tiso's Catholic-conservative feelings initially inhibited him from what appeared to be revolutionary moves. However, within a few days Hitler invited Tiso to Berlin, and offered assistance for Slovak nationhood. Hitler suggested that Slovakia should declare independence under German protection (i.e., Protectorate status), and that if not Hungary might annex the remaining territory of Slovakia. Without making an agreement, Tiso now requested the Czecho-Slovak President to call a meeting of the Slovak Diet for 14 March. During that session Tiso made a speech informing the Diet of his conversation with Hitler, confirming that he reserved any move for an independence decision to come from the Slovak Diet. On the initiative of the President of the assembly, Martin Sokol (himself previously a strong proponent of the Czecho-Slovak state with guaranteed autonomy for Slovakia), endorsed a declaration of independence. On 15 March, Germany occupied the remaining rump of Czechoslovakia after Hitler coerced a sick Czech President Emil Hácha into acquiescing.

Slovakia became the Slovak Republic, an independent state (under German protection) which was formally recognised by the Soviet Union and Germany, with de facto recognition by the United Kingdom and France (but not by the United States who were largely responsible, in 1919, for the new artificial state of Czechoslovakia). Czech émigrés and the United States considered Slovakia a puppet state of Germany. After the later recognition of the Czechoslovak government-in-exile by Great Britain, the British Foreign Office notified the Czech Foreign Ministry that Britain did not recognise any territorial claims of Czechoslovakia, nor could they commit to any fixed boundaries for the state, nor recognise the legal continuation of Czechoslovakia.

Tiso was initially Prime Minister from 14 March 1939 until 26 October 1939. Tiso not only supported Nazi Germany's invasion of Poland in September 1939 but contributed Slovak troops, which the Germans rewarded by allowing Slovakia to annex 300 square miles of Polish territory. On 1 October 1939, Tiso officially became President of the Slovak People's Party. On 26 October, he became President of the Slovak Republic, and appointed Tuka as Prime Minister. After 1942, President Tiso was also styled Vodca ("Leader"), an imitation of German Führer.

== Antisemitism and deportation of Jews ==
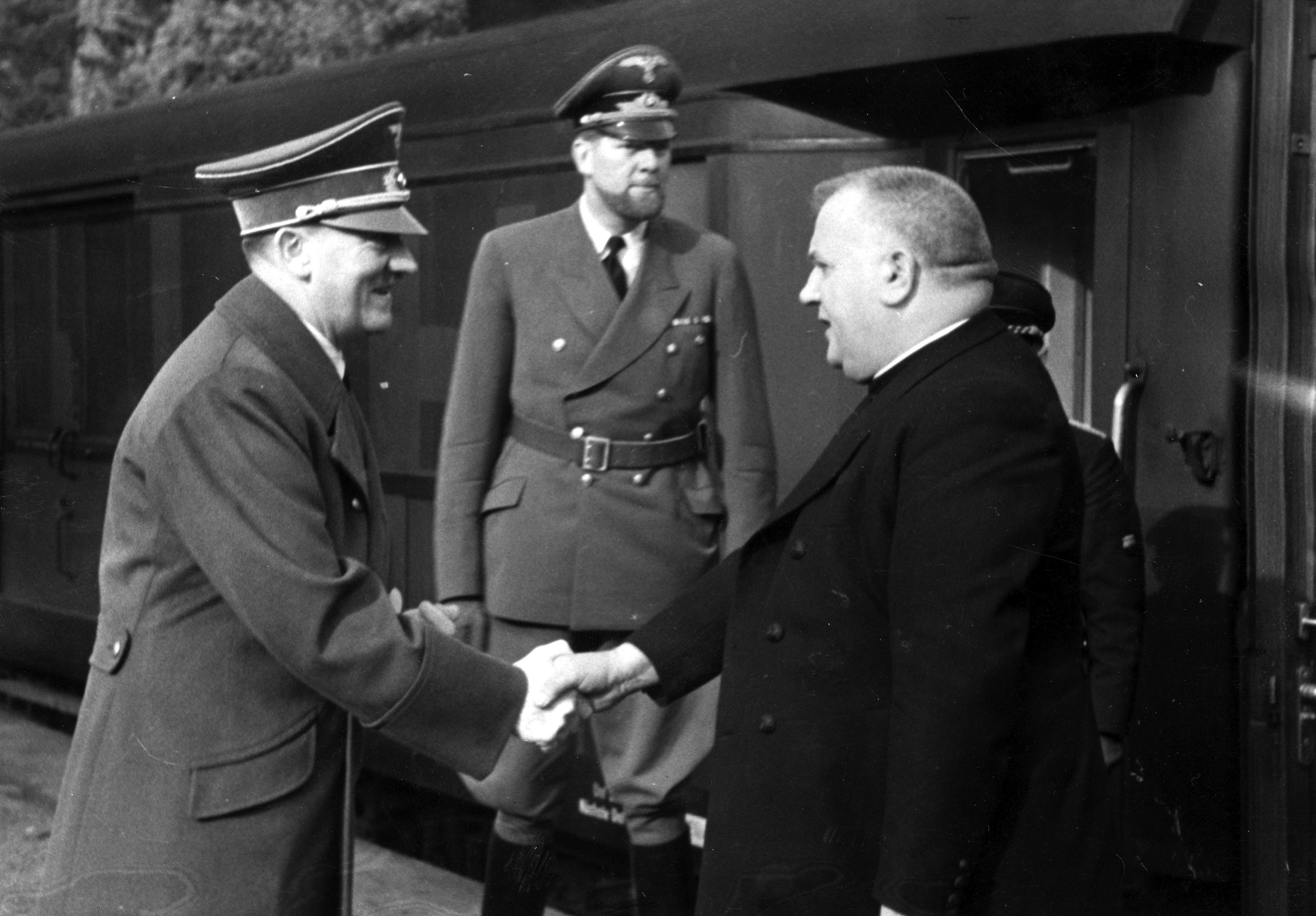
Jozef Tiso greeting Adolf Hitler, at the railway station of Hitler's headquarters 'Wolfsschanze' in East Prussia, with Alexander von Dörnberg in the middle, October 1941

At the Salzburg Conference on 28 July 1940, an agreement was reached to establish a National Socialist regime in Slovakia. Tuka attended the conference, as did Hitler, Tiso, Joachim von Ribbentrop, Alexander Mach (head of the Hlinka Guards), and Franz Karmasin, head of the local Carpathian German minority. As a result of the conference, two state agencies were created to deal with "Jewish affairs". The "Salzburg Summit" resulted in closer collaboration with Germany, and in Tuka and other political leaders increasing their powers at the expense of Tiso's original concept of a Catholic corporate state. The agreement called for dual command by the Slovak People's Party and the Hlinka Guard (HSĽS), and also an acceleration in Slovakia's anti-Jewish policies. The Nazi government appointed Sturmabteilung leader Manfred von Killinger as the German representative in Slovakia. Tiso however accepted these changes in subsequent conversation with Hitler. SS Officer Dieter Wisliceny was dispatched to Slovakia to act as an "adviser" on Jewish issues. The Party under Tiso and Tuka's leadership aligned itself with Nazi policy by implementing antisemitic legislation in Slovakia. The main act was the Jewish Code, under which Jews in Slovakia could not own any real estate or luxury goods, were excluded from public office and free occupations, could not participate in sport or cultural events, were excluded from secondary schools and universities, and were required to wear the Star of David in public. Tiso himself had anti-semitic views (as his earlier journalism made clear) which were widespread in Slovakia.

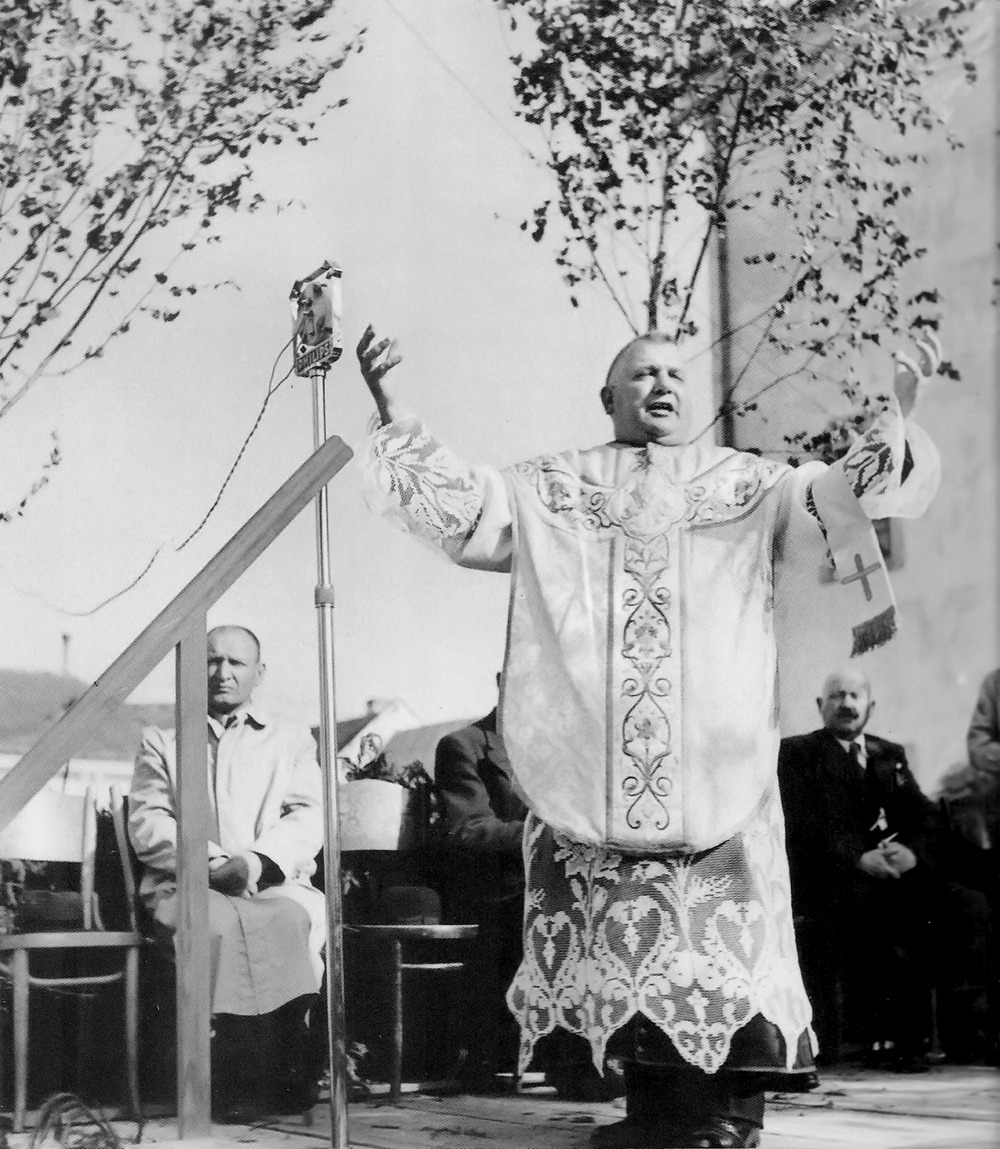
President Jozef Tiso celebrating a Catholic mass, 1941

Although there are dissenting opinions by modern politicians on his role in the Jewish deportations from Slovakia, it is clear that, in line with German policy and "suggestions" as well as his earlier antisemitism, he encouraged these actions, despite condemnation of the deportations from some Slovak bishops. In February 1942, Slovakia became the first Nazi ally to agree to deportations. The Nazis had asked for 20,000 young able-bodied Jews for labour duties. Tiso had hoped that compliance would aid in the return of 120,000 Slovak workers from Germany. In August 1942, after the majority of Slovak Jews had been sent to German-occupied Poland and it became clear that the deportees were being systematically murdered, Tiso gave a speech in Holič in which he called for Slovaks to "cast off your parasite [the Jews]" and justified continuing deportations of Jews from Slovakia. On 30 August, Hitler commented "It is interesting how this little Catholic priest Tiso is sending us the Jews!". Vatican undersecretary Domenico Tardini complained: "Everyone understands that the Holy See cannot stop Hitler. But who can understand that it does not know how to rein in a priest?"

Later in 1942, amid Vatican protests as news of the fate of the deportees filtered back, and the German advance into the Soviet Union was halted, Slovakia then became the first of Hitler's puppet states to shut down the deportations. Mazower wrote: "When the Vatican protested, the government responded with defiance: 'There is no foreign intervention which would stop us on the road to the liberation of Slovakia from Jewry', insisted President Tiso". Distressing scenes at railway yards of deportees being beaten by Hlinka guards had brought protests, including from leading churchmen such as Bishop Pavol Jantausch. The Vatican called in the Slovak ambassador twice to enquire as to what was happening in Slovakia. According to British historian Richard Evans, these interventions "caused Tiso, who after all was still a priest in holy orders, to have second thoughts about the programme". Giuseppe Burzio and others reported to Tiso that the Germans were murdering the deported Jews. Tiso hesitated and then refused to deport Slovakia's 24,000 remaining Jews. According to Mazower, "Church pressure and public anger resulted in perhaps 20,000 Jews being granted exemptions, effectively bringing the deportations there to an end".

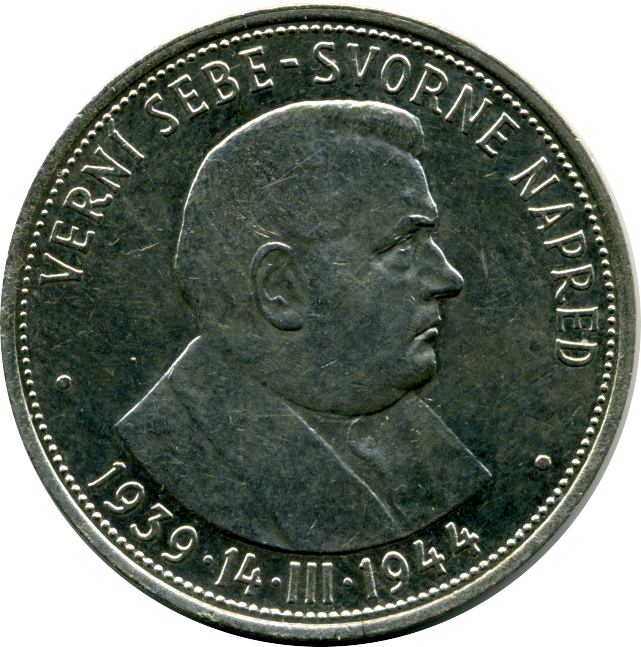
50 Slovak koruna silver coin issued for the fifth anniversary of the Slovak Republic (1939–1945) with an effigy of Tiso as Slovak President.

When in 1943 rumours of further deportations emerged, the Papal Nuncio in Istanbul, Msgr. Angelo Roncalli (later Pope John XXIII) and Burzio helped galvanize the Holy See into intervening in vigorous terms. On 7 April 1943, Burzio challenged Tuka over the rumours of extermination of Slovak Jews. The Vatican then condemned the renewal of the deportations on 5 May and the Slovakian episcopate issued a pastoral letter condemning totalitarianism and antisemitism on 8 May 1943. According to Evans, Tuka was "forced to backtrack by public protests, especially from the Church, which by this time had been convinced of the fate that awaited the deportees. Pressure from the Germans, including a direct confrontation between Hitler and Tiso on 22 April 1943, remained without effect."

In August 1944, the Slovak National Uprising broke out against the Tiso government. German troops were sent to quell this and with them came Einsatzgruppe H and security police charged with rounding up or murdering Slovakia's remaining Jews. During the German occupation, another 13,500 Jews were deported, most of them to Auschwitz, and 5,000 imprisoned. Some were murdered in Slovakia itself, in particular at Kremnička and Nemecká.

Tiso remained in office during the German army's occupation, but his presidency was relegated to a mostly titular role as Slovakia lost whatever de facto independence it had. Burzio begged Tiso directly to at least spare Catholics of Jewish ancestry from deportation and delivered an admonition from the Pope: "the injustice wrought by his government is harmful to the prestige of his country and enemies will exploit it to discredit clergy and the Church the world over".

By the end of the Holocaust, more than two-thirds of the Jews living in Slovakia had been murdered.

== Conviction and execution ==
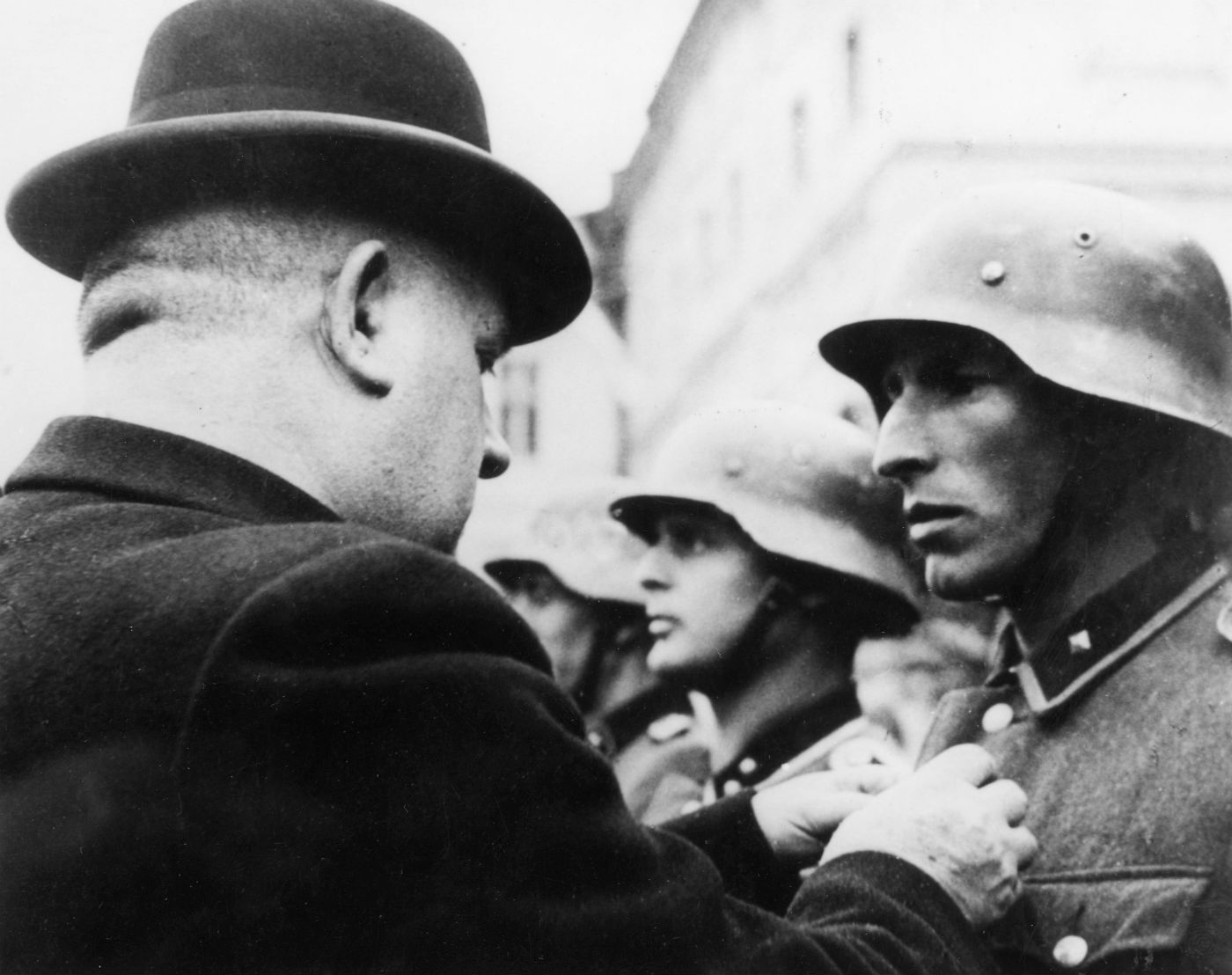
Jozef Tiso decorates German soldiers in Banská Bystrica in Slovakia, who had fought the Slovak National Uprising in 1944

Tiso lost all remnants of power when the Soviet Red Army conquered the last parts of western Slovakia in April 1945. He fled first to Austria, then to a Capuchin monastery in Altötting, Bavaria. In June 1945, he was arrested by the Americans and extradited to the reconstituted Czechoslovakia to stand trial in October 1945. On 15 April 1947, the Czechoslovak National Court (Národný súd) found him guilty of many of the allegations against him, and sentenced him to death. The trial's chief justice, Igor Daxner, himself a Communist and participant in the 1944 uprising, wrote that "Tiso never did anything...that could cleanse his reputation as an executioner. [He showed] a complete lack of sentiment toward his fellow man ... [and] indifference to [his] victims. ... [He has] a perverse character of such moral insanity that it is not possible with good conscience to recommend clemency."

The court concluded that Tiso's government had been responsible for the breakup of the Czechoslovak Republic; and found Tiso guilty of:

- administering a more radical "solution" of the Jewish question
- establishing a totalitarian fascist regime under the slogan "One God, one nation, one organisation" by founding the fascist organisations HSĽS (Hlinka's Slovak People's Party), Hlinkova garda (Hlinka Guard), and Hlinkova mládež (Hlinka Youth), the last two with compulsory membership
- destroying democracy
- awarding Karl Hermann Frank the Grand Cross following Frank's involvement in Czech students' murders and the Lidice massacre
- allowing the military occupation of the western part of Slovakia by the Wehrmacht, which seized state military assets valued 2 billion Ks and transported them to Nazi Germany
- persecuting and terrorizing the regime's 3,000 opponents, who were imprisoned, tortured, and, for some, slaughtered in the Ilava concentration camp
- expropriating the assets of the Czechs and the Jews by the Hlinka Guard
- damaging the state finances in the amount of 8.6 billions Ks due to clearing for Nazi Germany, another 3–4 billion Ks by supplying the Wehrmacht, and 7 billion Ks by secretly supplying the German occupational forces
- inciting of hatred against the Jews, excluding them from public life and economy, and restricting their personal freedom
- approving the Jewish Code, under which Jews in Slovakia were deprived of human rights, and were deported to the Sereď concentration camp and Nováky concentration camp, while Tiso sold some Jews under exceptions to the Code
- approving deportation of 57,837 Jews to German concentration camps in 1942 who were subsequently murdered, and paying for it with 100 million Ks to Nazi Germany
- delivering POWs to the German occupation forces knowing they would be murdered
- allowing the Gestapo and Sicherheitsdienst to imprison, torture, and abduct people, including Slovaks, before the Slovak National Uprising
- ordering the Hlinka Guard and other fascist organisations to help the German occupational forces catch, imprison, torture, and slaughter 4,316 people suspected of involvement in the Uprising and abduct 30,000 people to German concentration camps
- tolerating destruction of numerous villages (e.g. Kľak or Nemecká) by German occupational forces (e.g. Edelweiss (anti-partisan unit)) and the Hlinka Guard
- mobilising for German occupation forces
- allowing German occupational forces to abduct Slovaks for forced labour in Nazi Germany
- ordering civilians to take part in military fortification work for German occupational forces
- approving an eastern part of Slovakia to be declared operational territory of German forces and subjecting the Slovak Army to the German military leadership
- and many other crimes

Tiso was sentenced to death, to deprivation of his civil rights, and to confiscation of all of his property. Tiso appealed to President Edvard Beneš and expected a reprieve; his prosecutor had recommended clemency. However, no reprieve was forthcoming. Wearing his clerical garb and holding a metal crucifix, Tiso was hanged in Bratislava on 18 April 1947. The hanging was botched, as it failed to break his neck, causing Tiso to slowly suffocate to death. The Czechoslovak government buried him secretly to avoid his tomb becoming a shrine, but his grave was soon identified at the cemetery of Saint Martin's Cathedral in Bratislava. Decades later, a DNA test in April 2008 confirmed the remains as Tiso; they were exhumed and reinterred in Saint Emmeram's Cathedral in Nitra.

== Legacy ==
Under communism, Tiso was formulaically denounced as a clerical fascist. With the fall of communism in 1989, and the subsequent independence of Slovakia, heated debate began again on his role. James Mace Ward writes in Tiso's biography Priest, Politician, Collaborator (2013): "At its worst, [the debate] was fuel for an ultranationalist attempt to reconstruct Slovak society, helping to destabilize Czechoslovakia. At its best, the debate inspired a thoughtful reassessment of Tiso and encouraged Slovaks to grapple with the legacy of collaboration."

Later Tiso became a debated figure, rendered either as a clerical fascist or as a "conservative-authoritarian." Ward calls him a "Christian National-Socialist", a "Christian Social who increasingly resembled a generic national socialist." Unlike generic Nazis and Fascists, at the same time, he "struggled to keep progress from replacing God as the supreme measure of good."

On the 70th anniversary of the establishment of the First Slovak Republic in October 2008, a group of roughly twenty people, in commemoration of Tiso, created him a memorial grave in Martin cemetery.
