= 2008 Sai Kung bus crash =

Incident in New Territories, Hong Kong

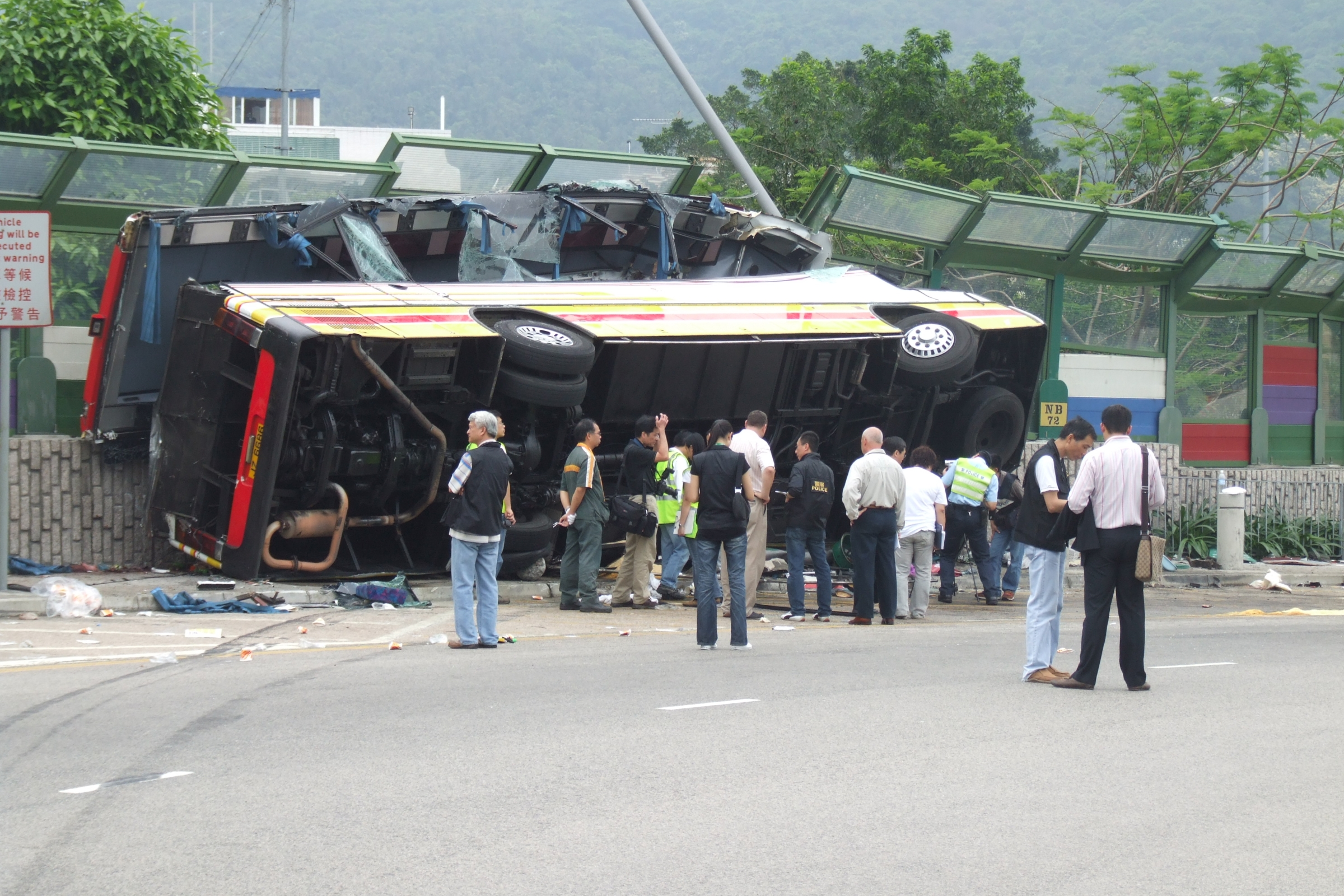
- Accident scene on 1 May 2008

Details
- Date: 1 May 2008; 09:02 HKT
- Location: Hiram's Highway roundabout near Nam Pin Wai bus station, Nam Pin Wai, Sai Kung District; New Territories, Hong Kong
- Incident type: Rollover

Statistics
- Passengers: 61
- Deaths: 19
- Injured: 43

On 1 May 2008, at approximately 09:02 HKT, a tour bus flipped onto its side on Hiram's Highway in Sai Kung District, New Territories. The crash killed 19 people and injured 43.

The incident was Hong Kong's third deadliest road traffic accident, behind a 2018 incident killing 19 and injuring 61, and a 2003 incident which killed 21.

== Incident ==
=== Crash ===
On 1 May 2008, at 8:30 am, two tour buses carrying several members of the Shinji Shumeikai Hong Kong branch left from Tsz Wan Shan for Sai Kung. At around 9:02, one of the tour buses rolled over when entering the Hiram's Highway roundabout in Nam Pin Wai. The bus flipped onto its side and struck a noise barrier, causing the roof of the bus to collapse, trapping many passengers between the roof and the seats, and hindering rescue efforts.

=== Immediate aftermath ===
Firefighters arrived after nine minutes, and 14 passengers were pronounced dead at the scene. A makeshift morgue was set up, the first time since a bus accident in 2003. Four more passengers died after being transferred to hospital, bringing the death toll to 18. Then-Chief Executive Donald Tsang visited Tseung Kwan O Hospital, where the largest amount of injured passengers were transferred, then visited the crash site. He expressed that this was Hong Kong's most serious traffic accident in recent years, and asked for all relevant departments to investigate the causes of this accident, as well as provide help for all affected families.

Four days after the crash, on 5 May, one more passenger died after being transferred to a hospital, bringing the death toll to a final of 19. Many of the survivors were left with lifelong injuries and disabilities.

== Criminal proceedings ==
The 33-year-old bus captain, Hung Ling-kwok, was charged with dangerous driving causing death. Investigators stated that Hung was travelling around 67 kph, while the speed limit was 50 kph. The bus was found to have no mechanical faults. The judge in the case criticised Hung for descending the hill in the wrong gear, failing to use the throttle or exhaust brake, and ignoring warning signs including passengers' repeated calls to slow down.

Hung apologised to the families of the victims in the District Court in June 2009, but the apology was not accepted.

On 1 May 2009, Hung pleaded guilty to one count of dangerous driving causing death, for which the maximum sentence was five years' imprisonment at the time of the offence. On 19 June 2009, Hung was sentenced to three years and four months in prison, with the maximum sentence being reduced in recognition of his guilty plea. His driving licence was also suspended for three years. However, as his driving licence suspension would take place during the period of his imprisonment, he would be able to drive upon his release.

The families of victims, as well as survivors of the crash, called the sentence excessively lenient. They felt that the prison sentence was light, and said that Hung should not be allowed to drive again. Hung evaded a longer jail term as new legislation raising the penalty for dangerous driving causing death (to ten years) only came into effect on 4 July 2008, and he was charged under the old law. On 29 June 2009, the victims petitioned the Department of Justice for a review of the sentence.

In response, the Department of Justice applied to the Court of Appeal to review the length of the driving ban. On 15 April 2010, the Court of Appeal doubled the driving ban to six years.

== See also ==
- 2003 Tuen Mun Road bus accident
- 2018 Hong Kong bus accident
