= Priest, Politician, Collaborator =

2013 book by James Mace Ward

Priest, Politician, Collaborator: Jozef Tiso and the Making of Fascist Slovakia
- Author: James Mace Ward
- Publisher: Cornell University Press
- Publication date: 2013

Priest, Politician, Collaborator: Jozef Tiso and the Making of Fascist Slovakia (2013) is a scholarly biography of Jozef Tiso, by the American historian James Mace Ward. The book received mostly positive reviews.

== Author ==
James Mace Ward is an American historian specializing in modern Eastern Europe and the World War II. He is a Teaching Professor in Modern European History at University of Rhode Island. He is also the author of the "Slovaks" chapter in European Fascist Movements.
