= 2003 Tuen Mun Road bus accident =

Double-decker crash in Tsuen Wan, Hong Kong

Coordinates: 22.370°N 114.079°E

July 2003 Hong Kong bus accident
- Wreckage of the bus following the crash

Details
- Date: 10 July 2003; 23 years ago around 06:15 - 06:30 HKT
- Location: Tuen Mun Road, Tsuen Wan; New Territories, Hong Kong
- Line: 265M
- Operator: Kowloon Motor Bus
- Incident type: Roadway departure

Statistics
- Passengers: 40
- Deaths: 21
- Injured: 20

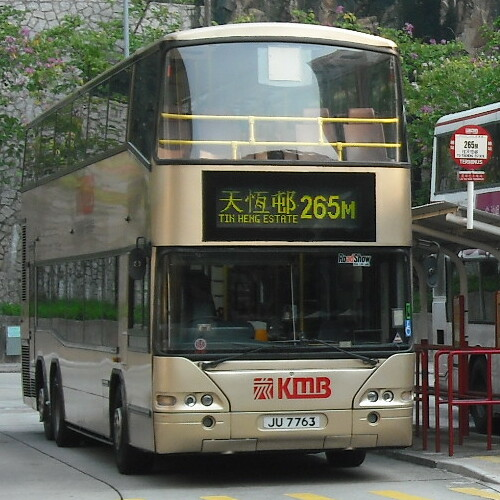
A KMB Neoplan Centroliner with KMB Route 265M display, similar to the bus involved in the crash

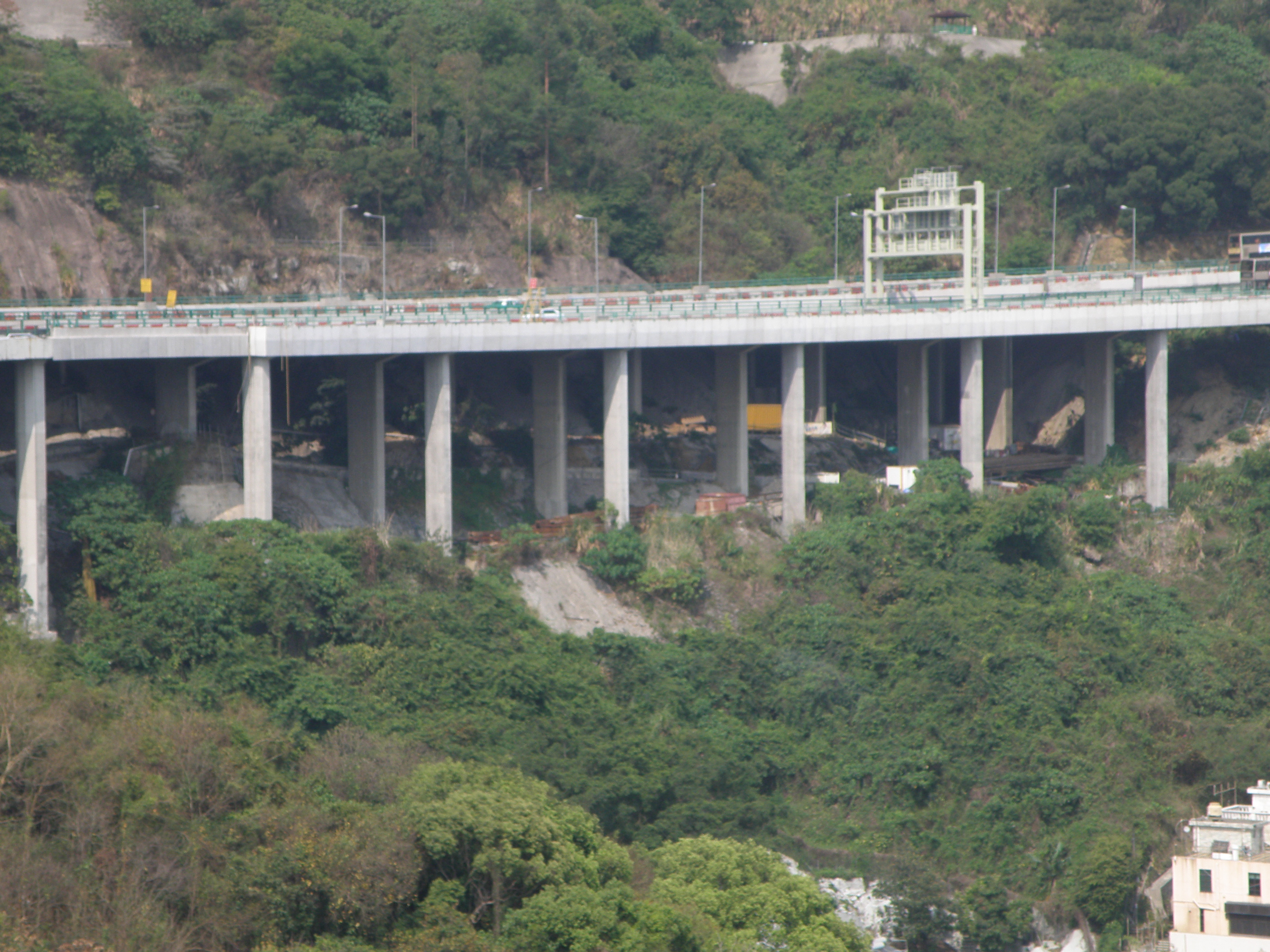
The site of the incident, as seen in 2014

In the morning of 10 July 2003, a Kowloon Motor Bus (KMB) Neoplan Centroliner double-decker bus plunged off a bridge near the Ting Kau section of the Tuen Mun Road in Tsuen Wan, New Territories. The crash killed 21 people and injured 20, which caused the deadliest traffic collision in Hong Kong's history.

== Incident ==
=== Crash ===
On 10 July 2003, between 6:15 and 6:30 HKT, a Neoplan Centroliner bus was operating route 265M of Kowloon Motor Bus (KMB). The bus departed from Lai Yiu Estate, Kwai Chung, Kwai Tsing, and was heading towards Tin Heng Estate, Tin Shui Wai, Yuen Long. A lorry running in the middle lane lost control as the bus approached the junction with Tsing Long Highway. The two vehicles collided, knocking the bus towards the side of the viaduct. The bus broke through the parapet, and plunged into Ting Kau Village 35 metres (115 ft) below. The bus driver and 18 passengers were killed in the crash.

=== Immediate aftermath ===
Rescue operations were described as being the most challenging encountered by the fire services since the Garley Building fire. This was due to the constraints at the site (a rural village sited on a steep hillside with no direct road access, only accessible on foot from Castle Peak Road), and the sheer volume of severely wounded casualties. Two more passengers died after being transferred to a hospital, bringing the death toll to 21. The incident left 20 injured.

The bus was later lifted back onto Tuen Mun Road and transported to the vehicle compound at Siu Ho Wan and was written off.

== Drivers ==
The KMB bus driver, Chan Wan-lin, died at the age of 41. He had been with the company for six years with a good driving record, and was familiar with the 265M operating route. Investigators believe that the incident did not involve physical exhaustion or fatigue, given that Chan was on leave two days before the incident, and the incident occurred early into his shift. Chan is survived by his wife and children; at the time, his wife was unemployed, his eldest daughter was 11 years old, and his youngest son was 5 years old.

The lorry driver, Li Chau-wing, was 53 years old at the time, and had three traffic violations between 2002 and the time of the accident. Li was driving the lorry on the middle lane at the time of the accident. He claimed that a passenger vehicle and a cargo vehicle that were following him suddenly cut out of the center lane, so he had to dodge and ended up crashing into the bus. Between this traffic accident and the first trial, Li was convicted of two additional traffic violations.

== Responses ==
After the incident, then-Chief Executive Tung Chee-hwa visited the crash scene and pledged that the government would do all that it could to aid the survivors, to investigate the accident and prevent similar accidents from ever happening again.

The lorry driver Li Chau-wing was sentenced to 18 months in jail after being found guilty of causing death by dangerous driving. At the time, it was the most serious road accident in Hong Kong history. He later appealed the rulings, which were subsequently overturned. Tests have shown that the vehicle he was driving was defective (tending to veer to the side when braking), and he was then found guilty of a lesser charge, careless driving, and his sentence was shortened to five months and a two-year driving ban.

As the accident involved several teachers from Tin Shui Wai, the Hong Kong Professional Teachers' Union started a charity fundraising movement (Chinese: 屯門公路車禍全港學校教職員募捐大行動) on the following day of the accident, which ended on September 30, 2007, and raised over HK$1,100,000.

== See also ==
- Bus services in Hong Kong
- Transport in Hong Kong
- 2008 Sai Kung bus crash
- 2018 Hong Kong bus accident
- 2018 Chongqing bus crash
