= Alexander von Dörnberg =

German jurist, diplomat and SS officer

Alexander Freiherr von Dörnberg zu Hausen
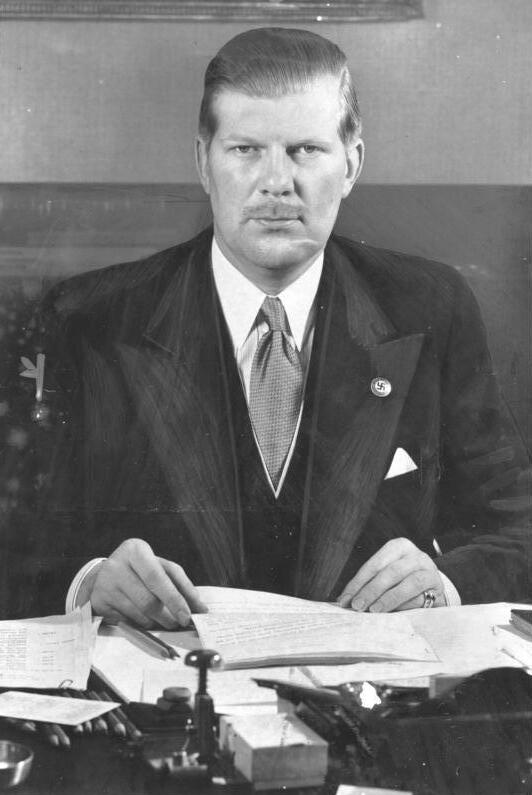
- Alexander Freiherr von Dörnberg (1938), wearing the Golden Party Badge
- Born: 17 March 1901; Darmstadt
- Died: 7 August 1983 (aged 82); Oberaula-Hausen, Hesse
- Military career
- Allegiance: Germany
- Branch: SS
- Rank: SS-Oberführer
- Other work: German diplomat and jurist

Alexander Freiherr von Dörnberg zu Hausen (17 March 1901 in Darmstadt – 7 August 1983 in Oberaula-Hausen, Hesse) was a German jurist, diplomat and SS officer. He was head of the Protocol Department of the Foreign Office from 1938 to 1945.

== Life and work ==
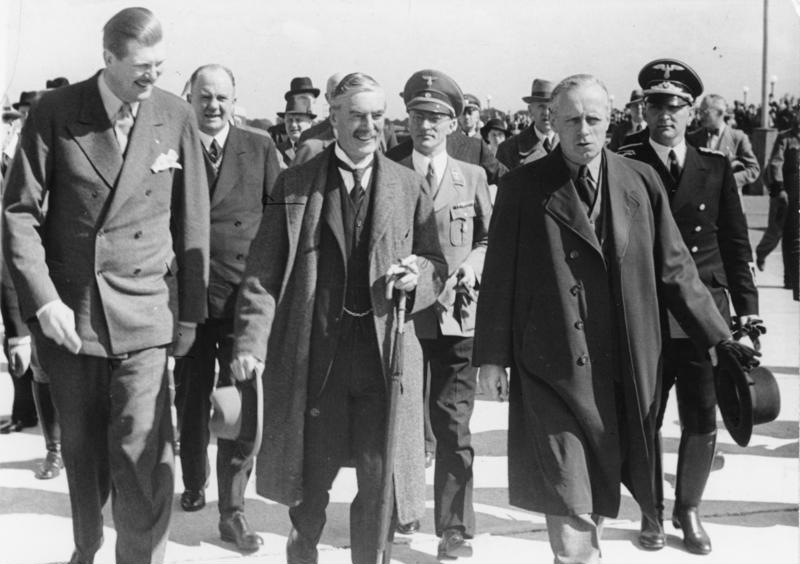
Dörnberg, Neville Chamberlain and Joachim von Ribbentrop on 16 September 1938 after Chamberlain had met with Adolf Hitler

He came from the Dörnberg family of Hessian nobility. In his youth, Dörnberg attended the Reform-Realgymnasium in Kassel. After his Abitur in 1919, Dörnberg joined the Freikorps and participated in the violent domestic disputes in Germany after the end of World War I. He then studied jurisprudence at several universities: Heidelberg, Bonn, Munich, Marburg, and Frankfurt. In 1920, he became a member of the Corps Saxo-Borussia Heidelberg, a student organization, and in 1921 the Corps Borussia Bonn. In 1925, he received his doctorate of law.

In 1926, Dörnberg was for some months private secretary to German Ambassador Ago von Maltzan and to the Embassy of Germany, Washington, D.C., before he officially joined the diplomatic service in 1927. At the Foreign Office, he was first assigned as attaché to Alfred Horstmann. In 1930, he took the diplomatic-consular examination. Subsequently, he was employed as attaché at the Germany embassy in Bucharest from 1930 to 1933.

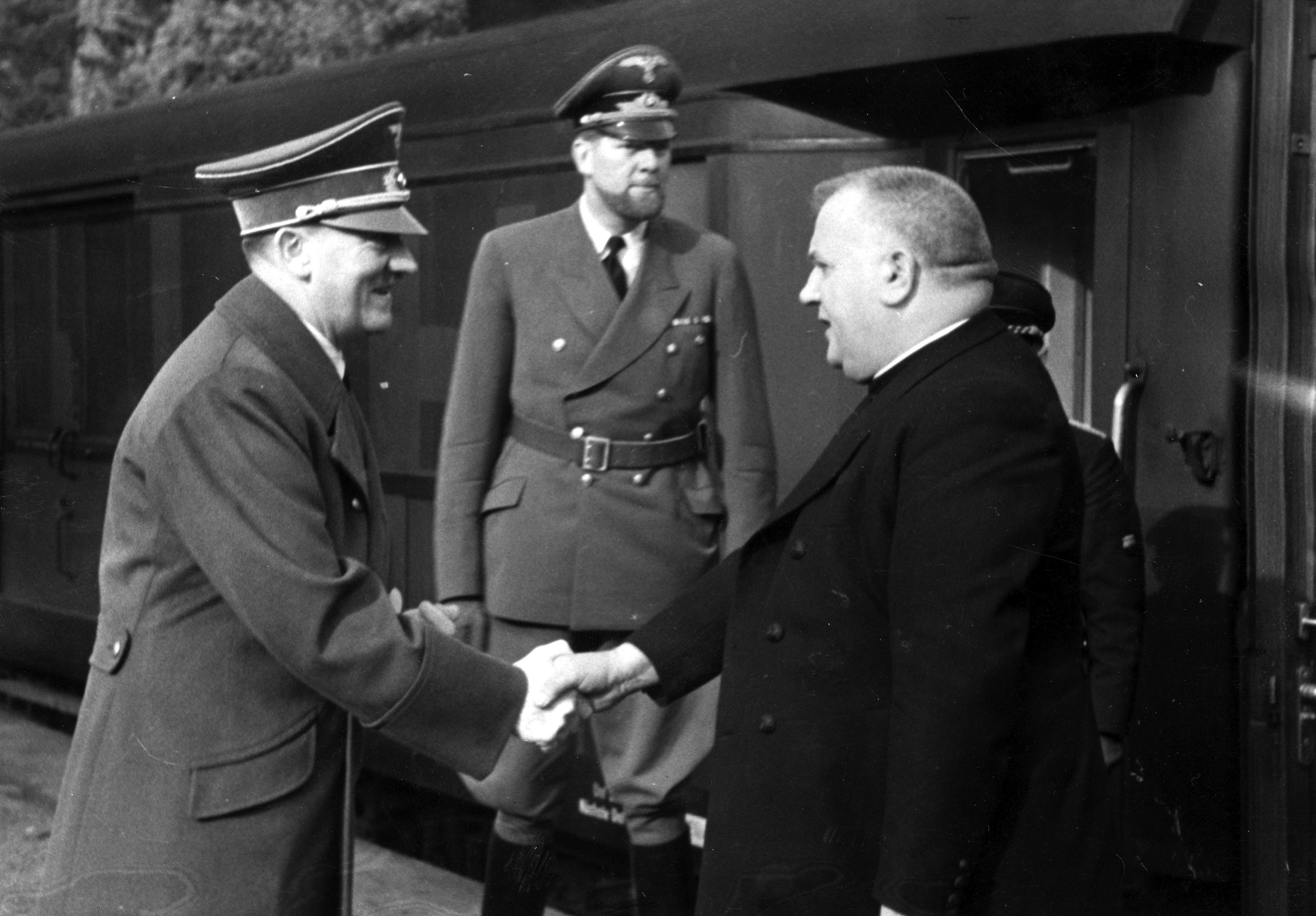
Dörnberg (center) with Adolf Hitler and the president of the Slovak Republic Jozef Tiso in Berlin in October 1941

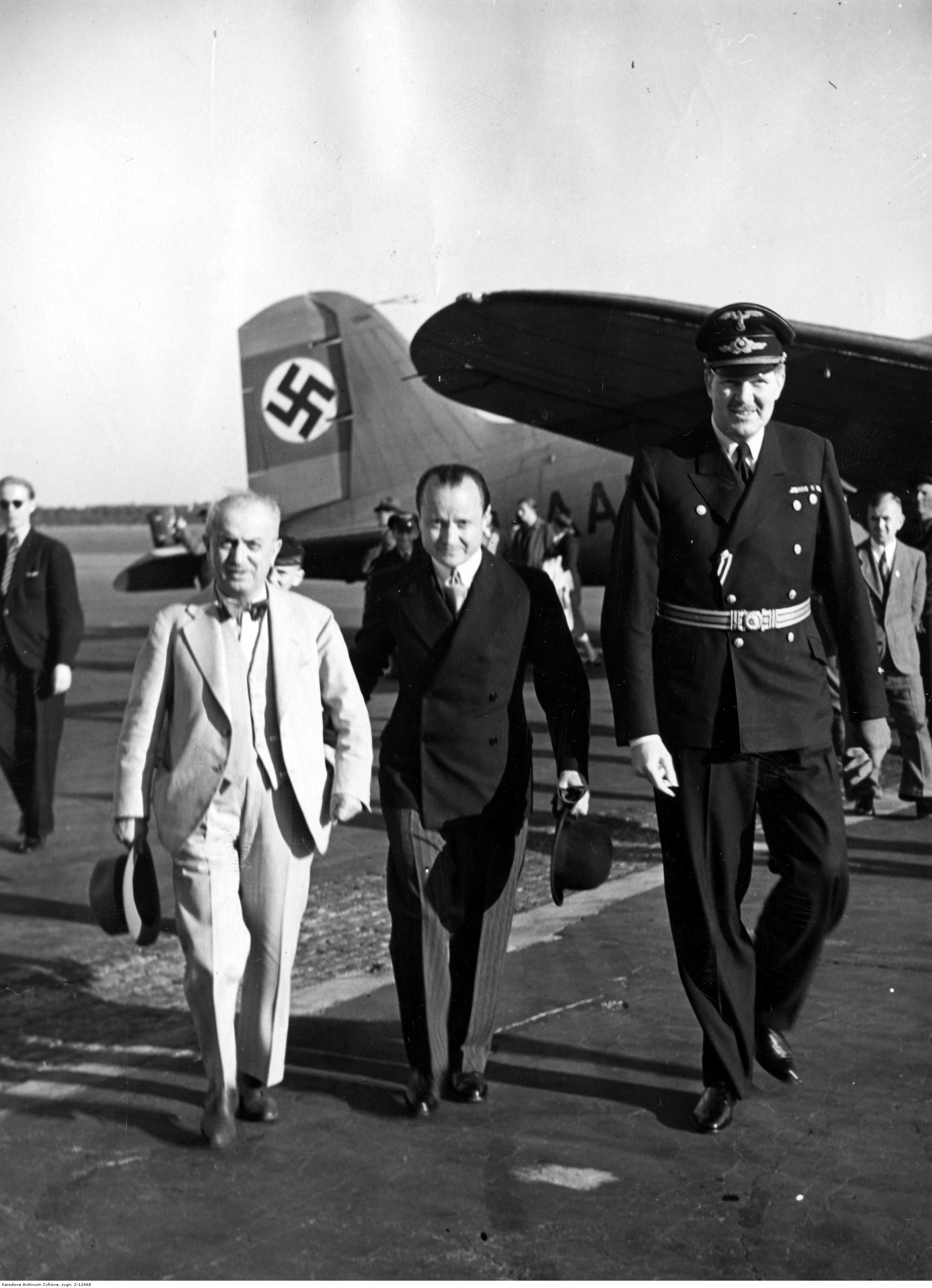
From left to right: Turkey's Ambassador to Berlin Saffet Arıkan, Embassy Undersecretary Kavour, chief of diplomatic protocol Baron Alexander von Doernberg at the airport.

In 1933, Dörnberg worked for several months in the Disarmament Department of the Foreign Office, before he worked at the Embassy in Tallinn, Estonia from autumn of 1933 to 1936. After a stopover in the Political Department of the Foreign Office from 1936 to 1937, he became a secretary of legation to the Embassy of Germany in London. There was an intensive collaboration between Dörnberg and the then German ambassador to Britain, Joachim von Ribbentrop, with whom he became friends for the first time.

On 1 January 1934, when he worked in Estonia, Dörnberg became a member of the NSDAP. In 1938, he also joined the SS, in which he reached the honorary rank of SS-Oberführer. In July 1938, Dörnberg was appointed as the successor to Vicco von Bülow-Schwante as Chief of the Protocol Department of the Foreign Office. He remained in this post until the collapse of the Nazi regime in 1945. In the autumn of 1938, Dörnberg received British Prime Minister Neville Chamberlain during the negotiations over the Munich Agreement. In August 1939, he accompanied Ribbentrop to Moscow to sign the Molotov–Ribbentrop Pact.

As a diplomat, Dörnberg held the title of Envoy Extraordinary and Minister Plenipotentiary.

== Post-war ==
After the German surrender, Dörnberg was arrested by the Allies and interrogated during the Nuremberg trials as a witness, especially in the Ministries Trial.

Greater public attention was given Dörnberg posthumously in 2005: The Protocol Department of the Foreign Office had Dörnberg's portrait photograph inserted between the heads of department of all successive terms since 1920, hanging in the corridors of Protocol Department on the first floor of the west wing of the Foreign Office building. This led to a dispute about the culture of remembrance of the Foreign Office and aroused the displeasure of the then Foreign Minister Joseph Martin Fischer.

== Bibliography ==
- Maria Keipert (Red.): Biographisches Handbuch des deutschen Auswärtigen Dienstes 1871–1945. Herausgegeben vom Auswärtigen Amt, Historischer Dienst. Band 1: Johannes Hürter: A–F. Schöningh, Paderborn u. a. 2000, ISBN 3-506-71840-1
- Eckart Conze, Norbert Frei, Peter Hayes und Moshe Zimmermann: Das Amt und die Vergangenheit. Deutsche Diplomaten im Dritten Reich und in der Bundesrepublik. Karl Blessing Verlag, München 2010, ISBN 978-3-89667-430-2.
- Hans-Jürgen Döscher: SS und Auswärtiges Amt im Dritten Reich. Diplomatie im Schatten der „Endlösung“. Ullstein, Frankfurt 1991, ISBN 3-548-33149-1
- Paul Seabury: Die Wilhelmstraße. Die Geschichte der deutschen Diplomatie 1930 - 1945. Frankfurt am Main 1956, p. 115
