= Death sentence with reprieve =

Penalty in Chinese law

- Simplified Chinese: 死刑缓期执行
- Traditional Chinese: 死刑緩期執行
Transcriptions
Standard Mandarin
- Hanyu Pinyin: Sǐxíng huǎnqī zhíxíng
- Wade–Giles: Ssu^{3}-hsing^{2} huan^{3}-ch`i^{1} chih^{2}-hsing^{2}
- IPA: [sì.ɕǐŋ xwàn.tɕʰí ʈʂǐ.ɕǐŋ]
Yue: Cantonese
- Yale Romanization: Séi-yìhng wùhn-kèih jāp-hàhng
- Jyutping: Sei2 jing4 wun4 kei4 zap1 hang4
- IPA: [sej˧˥ jɪŋ˩ wun˩ kʰej˩ tsɐp̚˥ hɐŋ˩]

(Abbreviation)
- Simplified Chinese: 死缓
- Traditional Chinese: 死緩
Transcriptions
Standard Mandarin
- Hanyu Pinyin: Sǐhuǎn
- Wade–Giles: Ssu^{3}-huan^{3}
- IPA: [sǐ.xwàn]
Yue: Cantonese
- Yale Romanization: Séi-wùhn
- Jyutping: Sei2 wun4
- IPA: [sej˧˥ wun˩]

Death sentence with reprieve (Chinese: 死刑缓期执行, abbr: 死缓) is a criminal punishment of the criminal law of the People's Republic of China. It is a two-year suspended sentence where the execution is only carried out if the convicted commits further crimes during the suspension period. The convicted remains incarcerated during the entire suspension period. After that period, the sentence is automatically reduced to life imprisonment, or to a 25-year prison sentence based on meritorious behavior. The reprieve is integrated into the sentence, unlike a pardon, which occurs after the sentence. The punishment is found in chapter 5 (death penalty), sections 48, 50 and 51.

== History and usage ==
The sentence emphasizes the severity of the crime and the mercy of the court, and comes from traditional Chinese jurisprudence, although it was only in 1979 that the sentence was included in modern Chinese criminal law. The recipient who was convicted of "heinous crime" was then subjected to two years of labour. After this two-year period, if the recipient showed "true repentance", the sentence would be commuted to life imprisonment. If they also “performed meritorious service”, their sentence would be commuted to 15–20 years. However, if they “resisted reform in a flagrant manner”, they would be executed by firing squad. The resistance, however, had to be shown to be particularly serious.

A 1997 update to the law amended the sentence to be for "extremely serious" crimes; if an intentional crime was not committed during the two year period, the sentence was then commuted to life imprisonment, which could be further commuted to at least 25 years. If the recipient performed “great meritorious service”, it would be commuted to 20–25 years, although if the original sentence had been for corruption in embezzling "especially large" sums of money, a sentence could only be commuted to life imprisonment with no chance of parole.

Chinese courts hand down this form of sentencing more often than actual death sentences. According to researchers, the post-2007 death penalty reforms resulted in a larger proportion of death sentences becoming suspended. Based on the 2024 sentencing of Yang Hengjun to death with reprieve for espionage charges, Ryan Mitchell, a law professor at the University of Hong Kong, stated that death with reprieve was used in recent years to reduce the rate of executions without abolishing capital punishment. He also stated that such sentences were typically reserved for serious crimes with potentially serious social consequences, and that they were rarely commuted to fixed-term imprisonment.

The 2015 criminal law amendment allowed sentences to restrict commutation to only life imprisonment without the possibility of parole for convictions of bribery or "plundering the public treasury". This was the case with Bai Enpei and Fu Zhenghua.

== See also ==
- Capital offences in China
- Death recorded
- Reprieve
