= Tai Po Mei =

Coordinates: 22.421437°N 114.198293°E

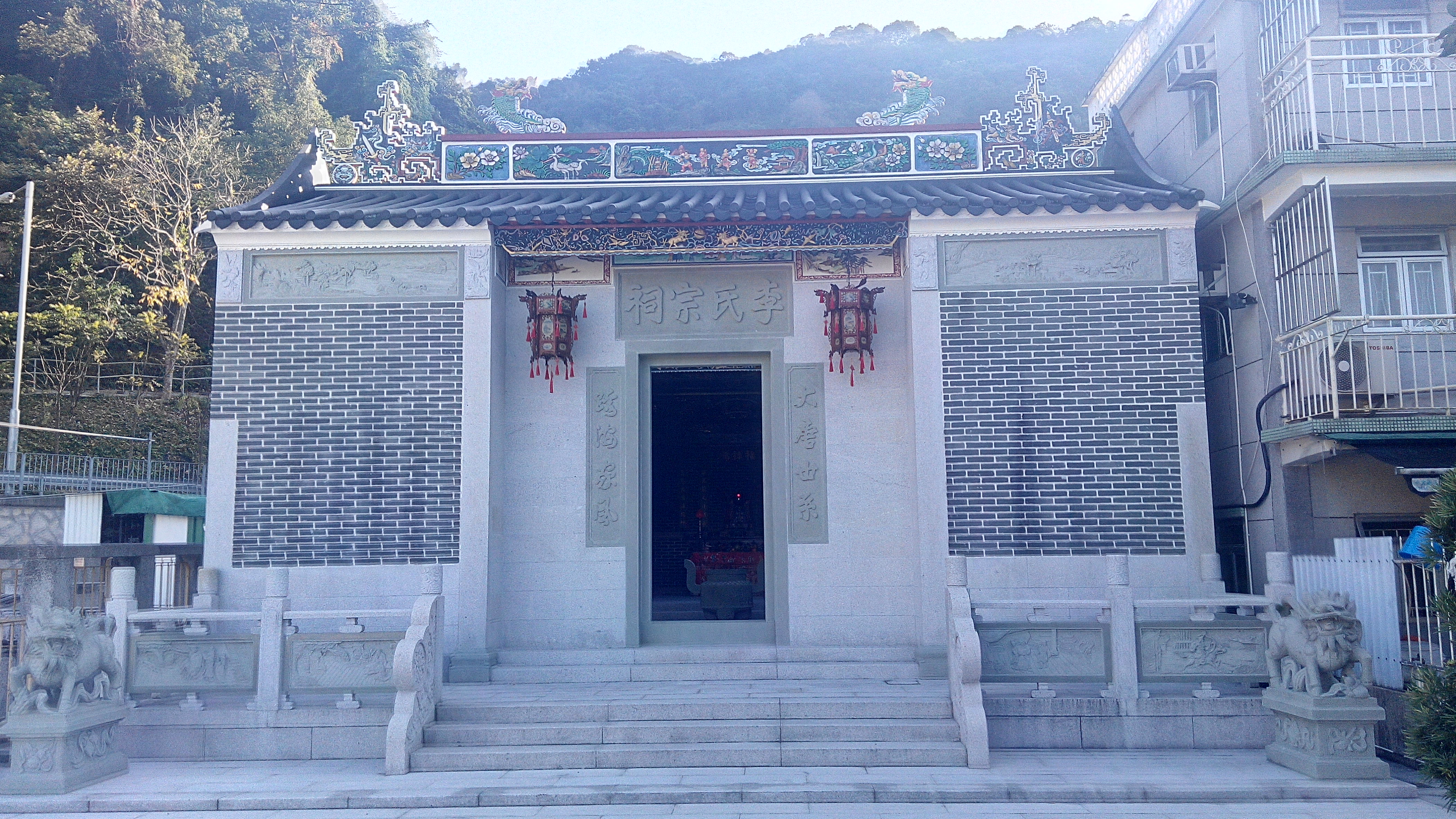
Lee Ancestral Hall in Tai Po Mei in December 2014.

Tai Po Mei (Chinese: 大埔尾) is a village in Tai Po District, Hong Kong.

== Administration ==
Tai Po Mei is a recognized village under the New Territories Small House Policy.

== See also ==
- 2018 Hong Kong bus accident
