= 2018 Lanzhou toll accident =

Motor vehicle accident in China

The 2018 Lanzhou toll crash was caused by a truck driver losing control of his vehicle and driving into a line of waiting cars in Lanzhou, China on November 3, 2018. According to local sources, 15 people were killed and another 44 injured in the 31 vehicle crash. The crash came about a week after the Chongqing bus crash.

== Incident ==
At 7:21 pm local time (11:20 GMT) on November 3, the 45-year-old truck driver from the Liaoning province crashed a tower-crane truck into a line of 31 vehicles about 50 meters from the Lanzhou South Toll Station on the Lanzhou-Haikou expressway. The section of the highway connects Lanzhou, the capital of Gansu and Haikou, the capital of Hainan. The truck driver was slightly injured in the crash, and was detained by police in order to begin the investigation into the crash. Local media has reported that the driver has claimed that the brakes of the vehicle had failed, and the lack of control had caused the crash. CCTV of the area, documented the crash and its aftermath, along with the heavy snow that the area was experiencing.

== Victims ==
Ten of the 44 injured sustained serious injuries, and 15 people were reportedly killed.
