= Second Wanzhou Yangtze River Bridge =

Second Wanzhou Bridge 萬州長江二橋
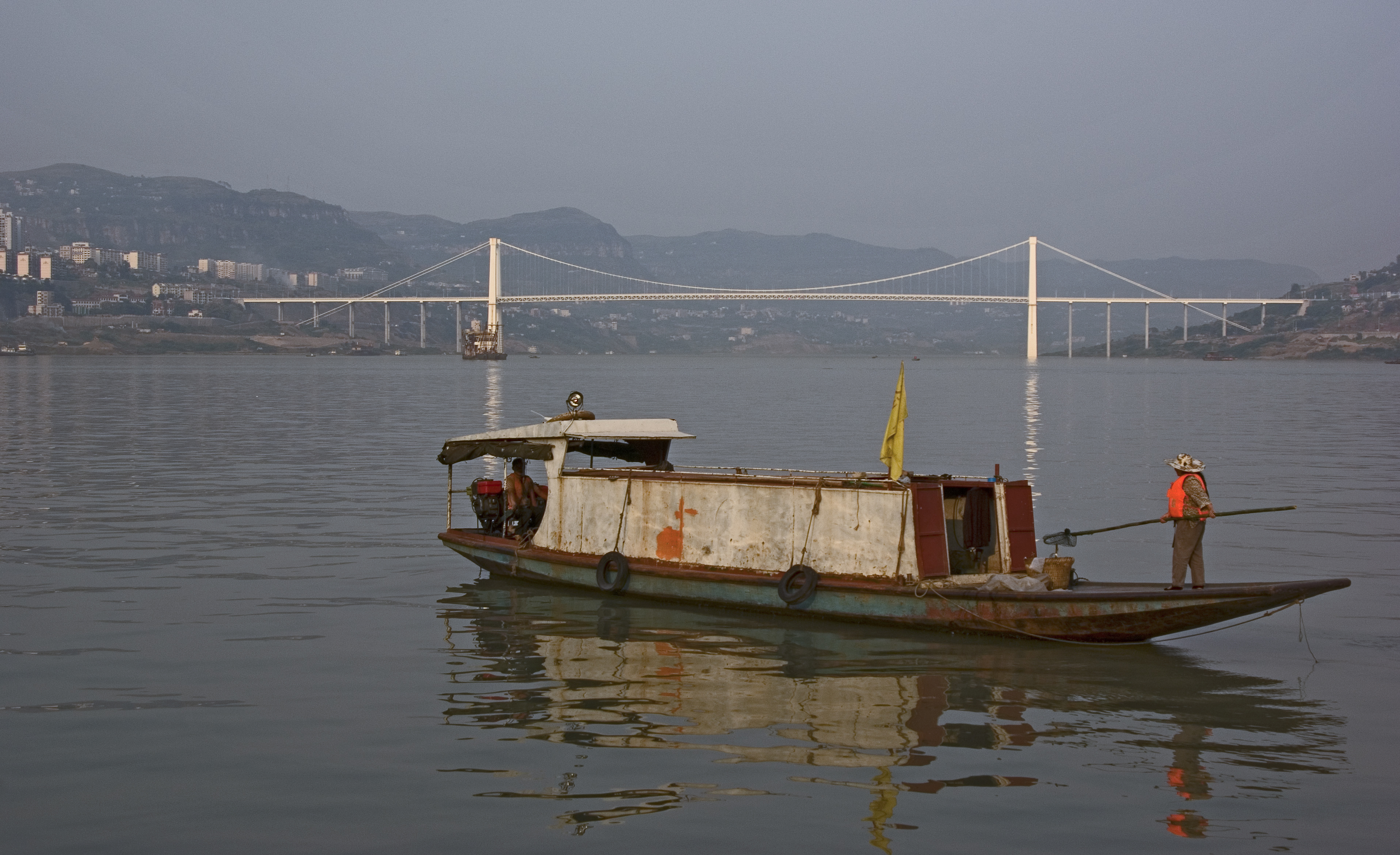
- Coordinates: 30.825889°N 108.404778°E
- Crosses: Yangtze River
- Locale: Wanzhou District, Chongqing, China
- Other name: Second Wanxian Bridge

Characteristics
- Design: Suspension Bridge
- Total length: 1,153.86 metres (3,785.6 ft)
- Longest span: 580 metres (1,900 ft)

History
- Construction start: 2001
- Opened: 2004

Location
- Interactive map of Second Wanzhou Bridge

The Second Wanzhou Yangtze River Bridge (万州长江二桥) is a suspension bridge over the Yangtze River in Wanzhou District of Chongqing, China. Completed in 2004, it has a main span of 580 metres (1,900 ft) places it among the longest suspension spans in the world.

== Accidents ==
On 29 October 2018, a bus plunged off the Second Wanzhou Yangtze River Bridge into the Yangtze River. At least 13 were killed.

== See also ==
- List of longest suspension bridge spans
- Yangtze River bridges and tunnels
