= National indifference =

National indifference is the status of lacking a strong and consistent national identity. The concept was originated by scholars of the Bohemian lands, where many inhabitants historically resisted classification as either Czechs or Germans, around 2000. It was outlined by Tara Zahra in her 2010 paper published in Slavic Review, "Imagined Noncommunities: National Indifference as a Category of Analysis". In 2016, an academic conference was held in Prague to discuss the concept.

== Zahra's concept ==
Zahra notes that even as most scholars accept that nationalities are imagined communities, they continue to use national categories, such "the Czechs", "the Germans", etc. in an uncritical way. According to Zahra, national indifference is "a new label for phenomena that have long attracted the attention of historians and political activists"—particularly negative attention from nationalists complaining about perceived disloyalty. Zahra intends the concept of national indifference to provide a means of studying history without assuming national identities of historical subjects. It also helps to study the resistance of pre-nationalist identities to nationalist activism, usually in cases where either one or multiple nationalism movements attempt to mobilize a population. She outlines three types of national indifference:

1. National agnosticism: the "complete absence of national loyalties as many individuals are identified more strongly with religious, class, local, regional, professional, or familial communities";
2. National ambivalence, characterized by opportunism and side-switching;
3. Bilingualism and openness to interethnic marriage.

She concedes that national indifference is difficult to study, because of such factors as nationalization of history, archives that are dedicated to national history, political apathy among nationally indifferent people, and censuses that do not recognize national indifference or bilingualism.

== Applications ==
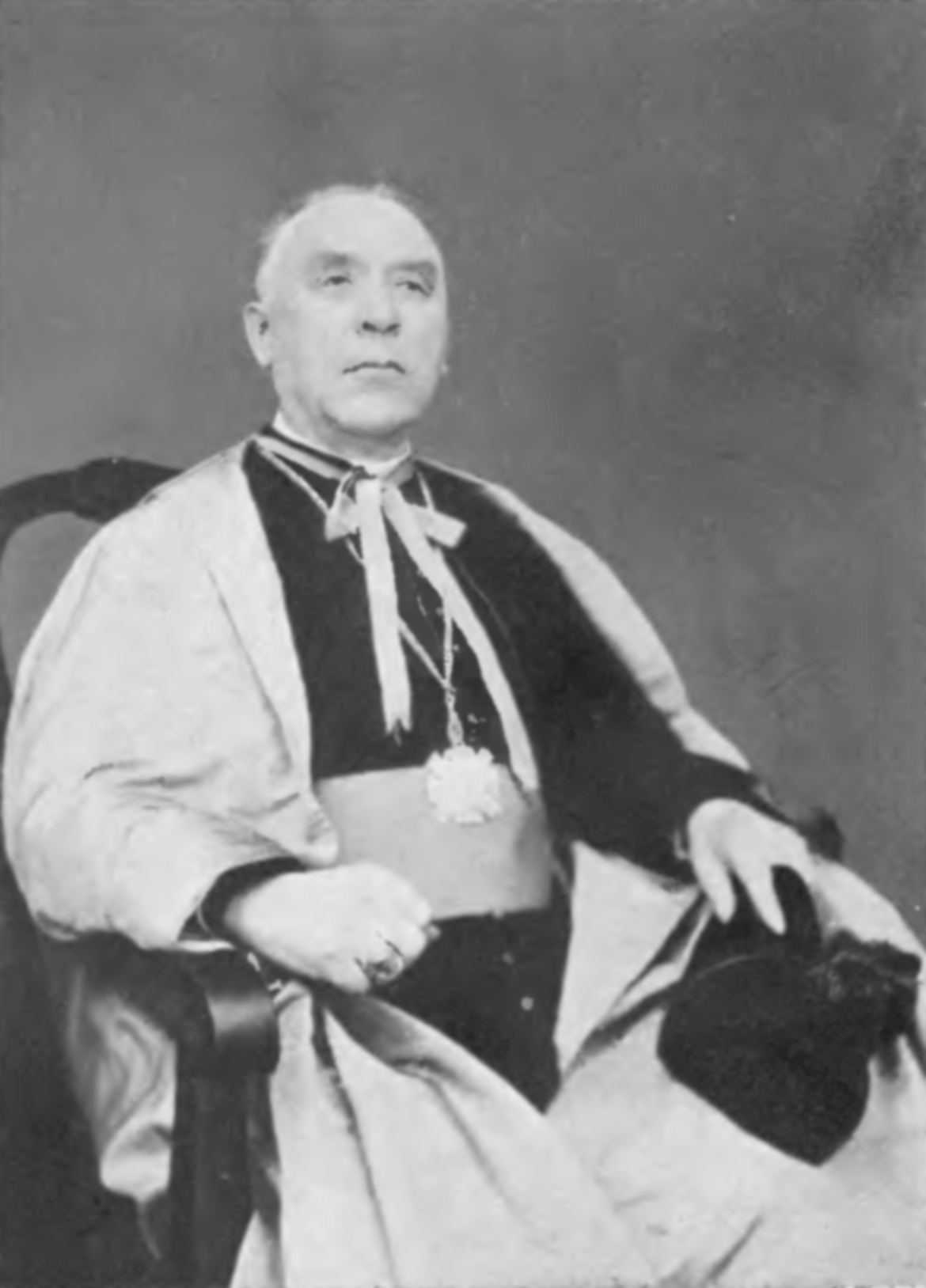
In 1906, Jan Kapica asked, "What is an Upper Silesian? Is he a German, a Pole, a Prussian, simply an Upper Silesian, or simply a Catholic or, perhaps, even just an abstract human being?"

Apart from Bohemia, the concept of national indifference has been applied to other Habsburg areas, in addition to the German–French and German–Polish borderlands. More recently it has been applied to parts of the Russian Empire such as Baltics and Bessarabia.

Many instances of national indifference have been cited:

- In mid-nineteenth century the Kingdom of Dalmatia, locals often identified as both Italian and Slavic. A similar but less widespread practice occurred in the Kingdom of Slavonia, where elites oscillated between Croat, Hungarian, and Serbian nation-building projects, often opting for a regional Slavonian identity as a compromise.
- In early-twentieth century Upper Silesia, many people rejected both German nationalism and Polish nationalism, instead focusing on Catholic identity. The most powerful political parties did not have a nationalist agenda. The League of Nations World Court officially recognized national indifference in Silesia, finding that the line between Poles and Germans was murky and undefined.
- The number of German-speakers in the Czech lands decreased by 400,000 between 1909 and 1921, which involved considerable side-switching.
- In 1930, the Czechoslovak State Statistical Office proposed that Czechoslovak citizens should be allowed to register themselves as "without nationality" on the census, just as it was possible to register as "without religion". Officials argued that "Not all people have national feelings or consciousness, or the desire to belong to a specific national community". This view was rejected by Czech nationalists and never implemented.
- Nazi officials claimed that Germanness was determined by race, but in practice they used national indifference in order to sign up more people, not previously identified as Germans, to the Volksliste; according to Doris Bergen, some people resorted to displays of antisemitic invective and violence to increase their perceived Germanness.
- In the Protectorate of Bohemia and Moravia, national polarization between Czechs and Germans resulted from the effects of the Nazi occupation and efforts to classify "a hopelessly mixed people".
- In the Polish census of 1931, 707,000 respondents listed themselves as Tutejszy, meaning "local", "from here".

== Responses ==
Critics of the concept argue that "indifference" is often associated with passivity, which may not be the case. Alternate terms have been proposed by other scholars such as Karsten Brüggemann or Katja Wezel, including "anationalism", "national ambiguity", and "hybridity". According to Per Bolin and Christina Douglas, the concept may be useful when discussing demotic national movements, but is unlikely to be applicable to elite nationalism (such as Baltic Germans).

== See also ==
- Cosmopolitanism
- Transnationalism
