= List of spa towns in Slovakia =

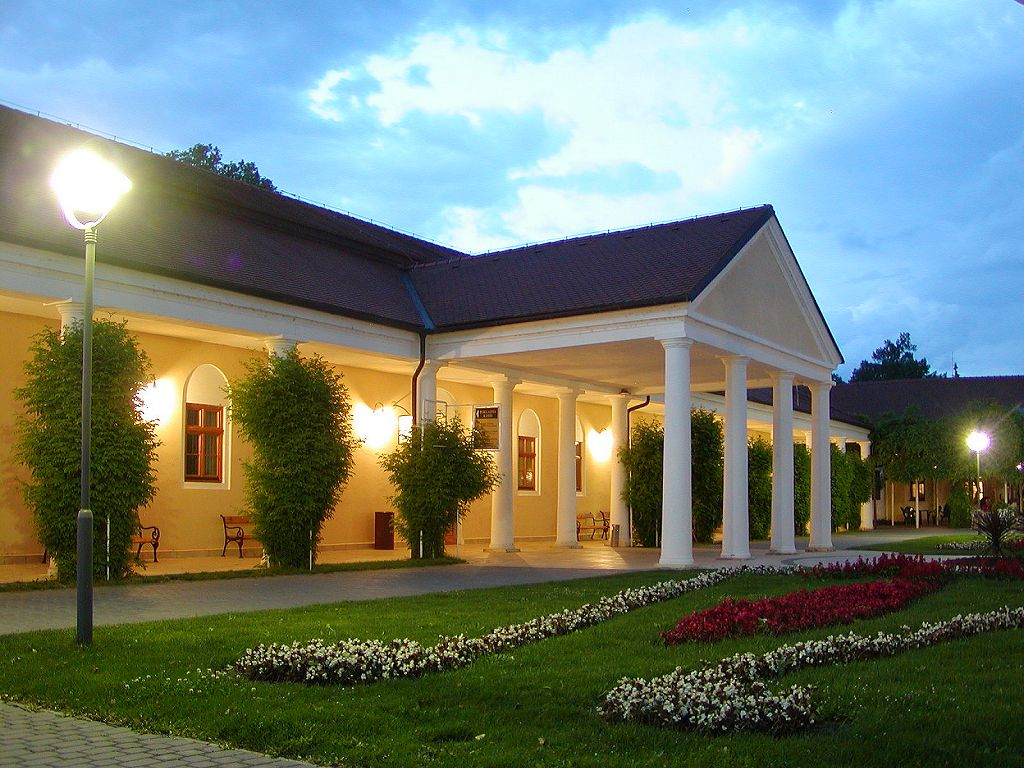
The Napoleon Spa in Piešťany.

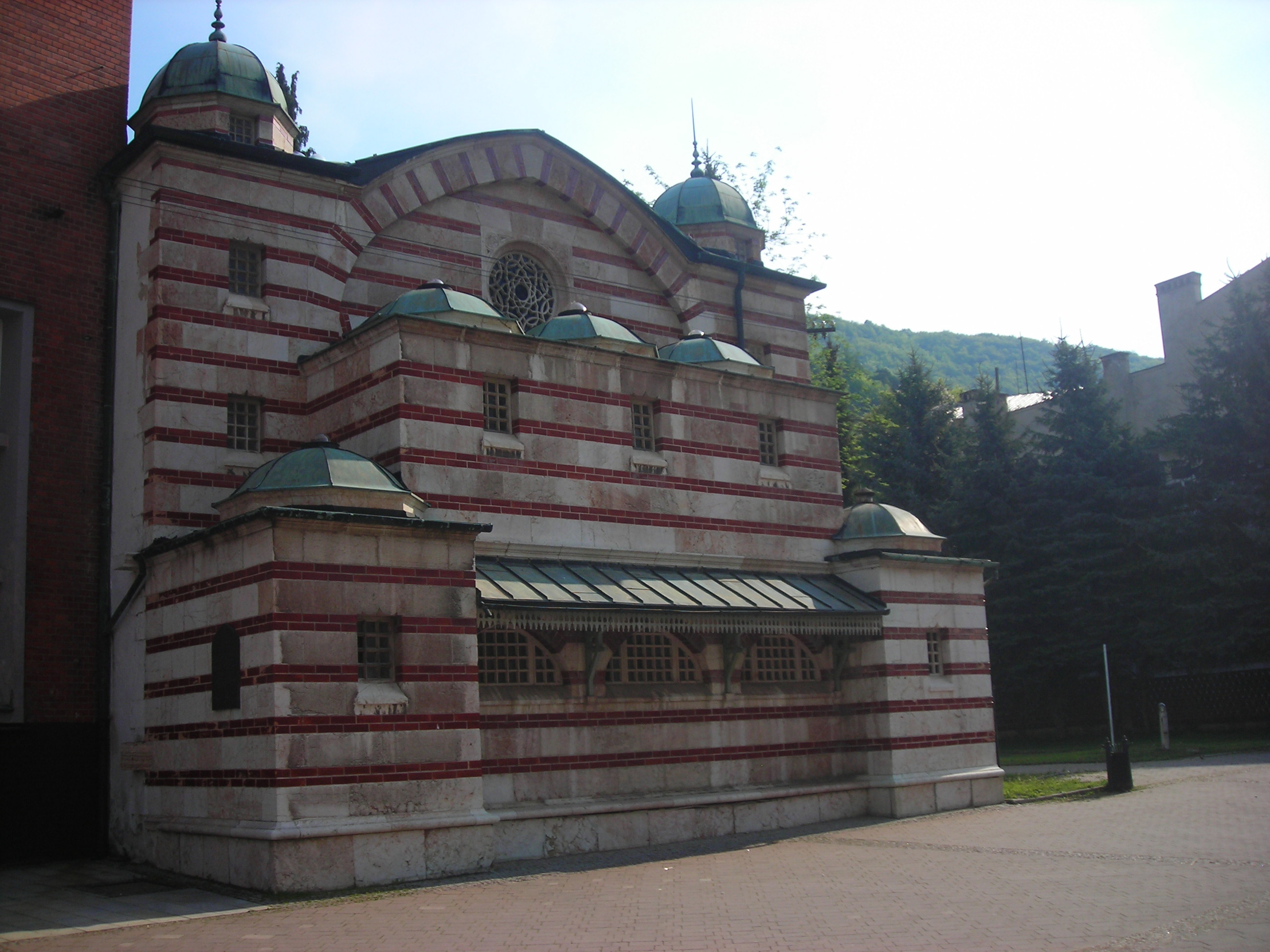
Turkish spa Sina (Hammam) in Trenčianske Teplice.

In Slovakia about 1,600 mineral sources providing curative water and high quality mineral water for drinking are registered. There are 25 thermal spa towns built on these mineral springs. The most visited are Piešťany, Trenčianske Teplice, Bardejov and Dudince.

List of spa towns:

- Bardejovské Kúpele
- Bojnice
- Brusno
- Číž
- Dudince
- Korytnica-kúpele
- Liptovský Ján
- Lúčky
- Piešťany
- Rajecké Teplice
- Kúpele Sliač
- Nimnica
- Smrdáky
- Sklené Teplice
- Vyšné Ružbachy
- Trenčianske Teplice
- Turčianske Teplice

In addition to thermal spas there are also several climatic spas (Štrbské Pleso, Nový Smokovec, Štós, Tatranské Matliare, High Tatras).
