= Capital offences in China =

Crimes punishable by death

In Mainland China, there are 46 crimes punishable by death. These are defined in the criminal law of China, which comprehensively identifies criminal acts and their corresponding liabilities.

== List of capital offenses ==
=== Crimes Endangering National Security ===
Endangering national security is among the crime categories included in the 1997 revision of China's criminal code. It comprises Articles 102 to 113 of the 1997 Criminal Law and imposes the confiscation of property as a supplementary penalty. The crimes included are:

1. Treason
2. Separatism
3. Armed rebellion, rioting
4. Collaborating with the enemy
5. Spying
6. Selling state secrets
7. Providing material support to the enemy

=== Crimes Endangering Public Security ===
8. Arson
9. Flooding
10. Bombing
11. Spreading dangerous substances (e.g., radioactive, toxic, pathogenic)
12. Endangering public safety through dangerous means
13. Sabotaging electricity equipment
14. Sabotaging gas, fuel, petroleum, or other flammables or explosives
15. Sabotaging transport vehicles
16. Sabotaging transport equipment
17. Hijacking aircraft
18. Illegal manufacturing, selling, transport, postal delivery, or storage of firearms, ammunition or explosives
19. Illegal manufacturing, selling, transporting or storing dangerous materials
20. Theft or snatching of firearms, ammunition, explosives or other dangerous substances
21. Robbery of firearms, ammunition, explosives or other dangerous substances

=== Economic crimes ===
22. Production or sale of counterfeit medicine
23. Production or sale of poisonous or hazardous food products

=== Crimes against people ===
24. Intentional homicide
25. Intentional assault causing death or causing permanent disability through cruel means
26. Rape
27. Kidnapping
28. Trafficking women and children

=== Crimes against property ===
29. Robbery

=== Crimes against public order ===
30. Violent prison escape
31. Raiding a prison
32. Smuggling, selling, transporting or manufacturing illegal drugs

=== Crimes against national defense ===
33. Sabotaging weapons, military installations, or military communications
34. Providing substandard weapons or military installations

=== Corruption and bribery ===
35. Embezzlement
36. Accepting bribes

=== Breach of duty by soldiers ===
37. Insubordination
38. Concealment or false reporting of military intelligence
39. Refusing to pass or falsely passing orders
40. Surrender
41. Cowardice on the battlefield
42. Defection with aircraft or ships
43. Stealing or illegally providing military secrets to foreign institutions, organizations or individuals
44. Theft or snatching of military weaponry or materiel
45. Illegally selling or transferring military weaponry or equipment
46. Killing innocent inhabitants of war zones or looting their property

== Former capital offences ==
A 2011 amendment to this law for the purpose of legal provisions improvement reduced the number of capital crimes by 13 and gave more lenient punishments to minors and the elderly (75 years old and above). The crimes no longer punishable by death are as follows:

1. Trafficking cultural artefacts
2. Trafficking precious metals
3. Trafficking precious animals or precious animal products
4. Trafficking general goods or objects
5. Cheque fraud
6. Financial certificate fraud
7. Letter of credit fraud
8. Fraudulently issuing dedicated value-added tax invoices to obtain tax refunds for export, or fraudulently issuing tax deduction invoices
9. Forging or selling forged dedicated value-added tax invoices
10. Theft of financial institutions or precious cultural artefacts
11. Teaching techniques of committing crimes
12. Plundering ruins of ancient cultures or ancient tombs
13. Plundering fossils of ancient humans or ancient vertebrates

In 2015, the criminal code was amended to remove nine capital offenses:

1. Smuggling weapons or ammunition
2. Smuggling nuclear materials
3. Smuggling counterfeit money
4. Counterfeiting
5. Investment fraud/fraudulent fundraising
6. Organizing prostitution
7. Forcing prostitution
8. Obstructing military affairs
9. Spreading rumors and undermining morale during wartime
