= 2018 Hong Kong bus accident =

Fatal double-decker bus crash in Tai Po

Coordinates: 22.4201°N 114.1960°E

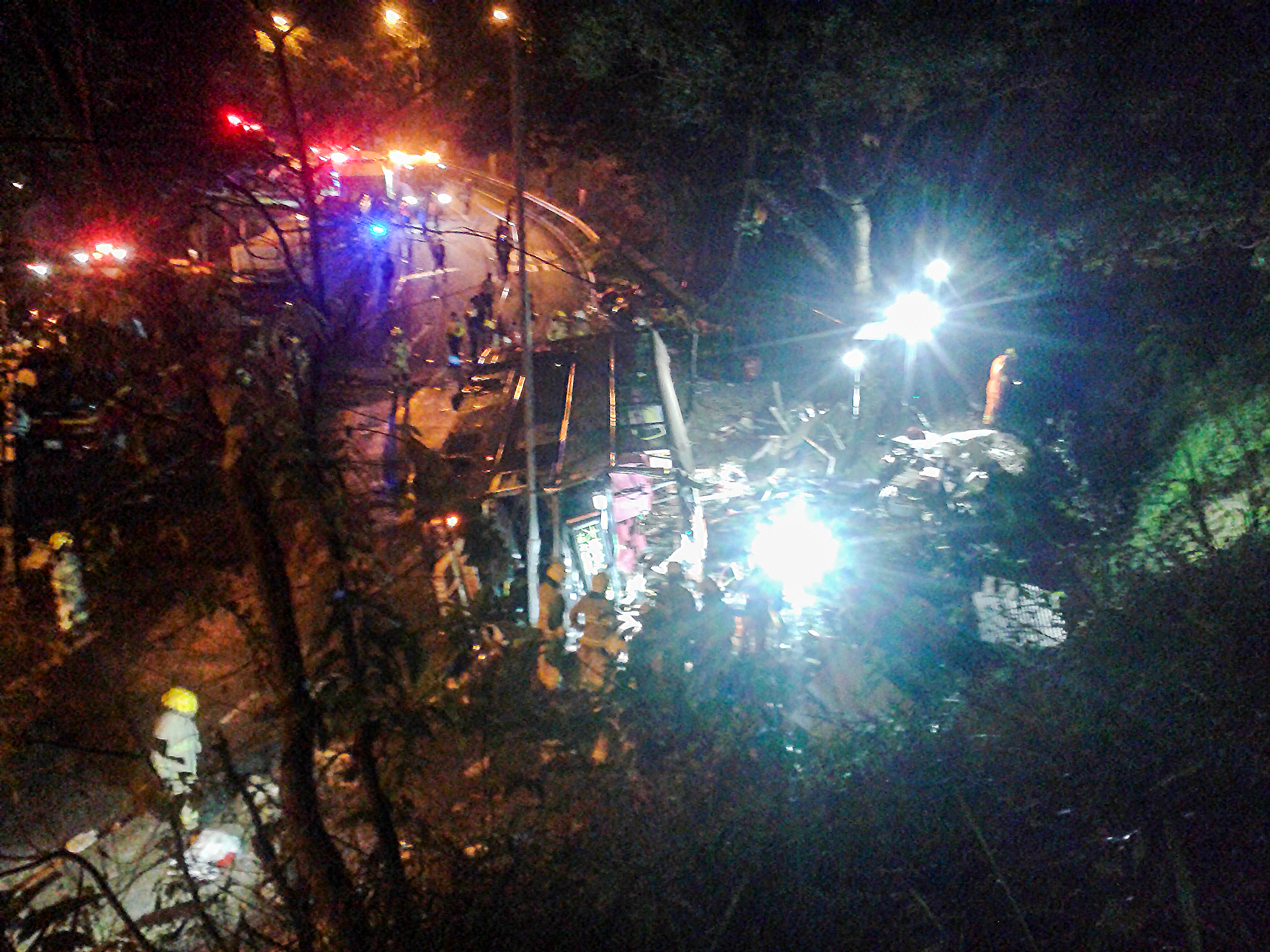
- Accident scene on 10 February 2018

Details
- Date: 10 February 2018; 18:13 HKT
- Location: Tai Po Mei, Tai Po Road; New Territories, Hong Kong
- Line: 872
- Operator: Kowloon Motor Bus
- Incident type: Rollover
- Cause: Excessive speed

Statistics
- Deaths: 19
- Injured: 65

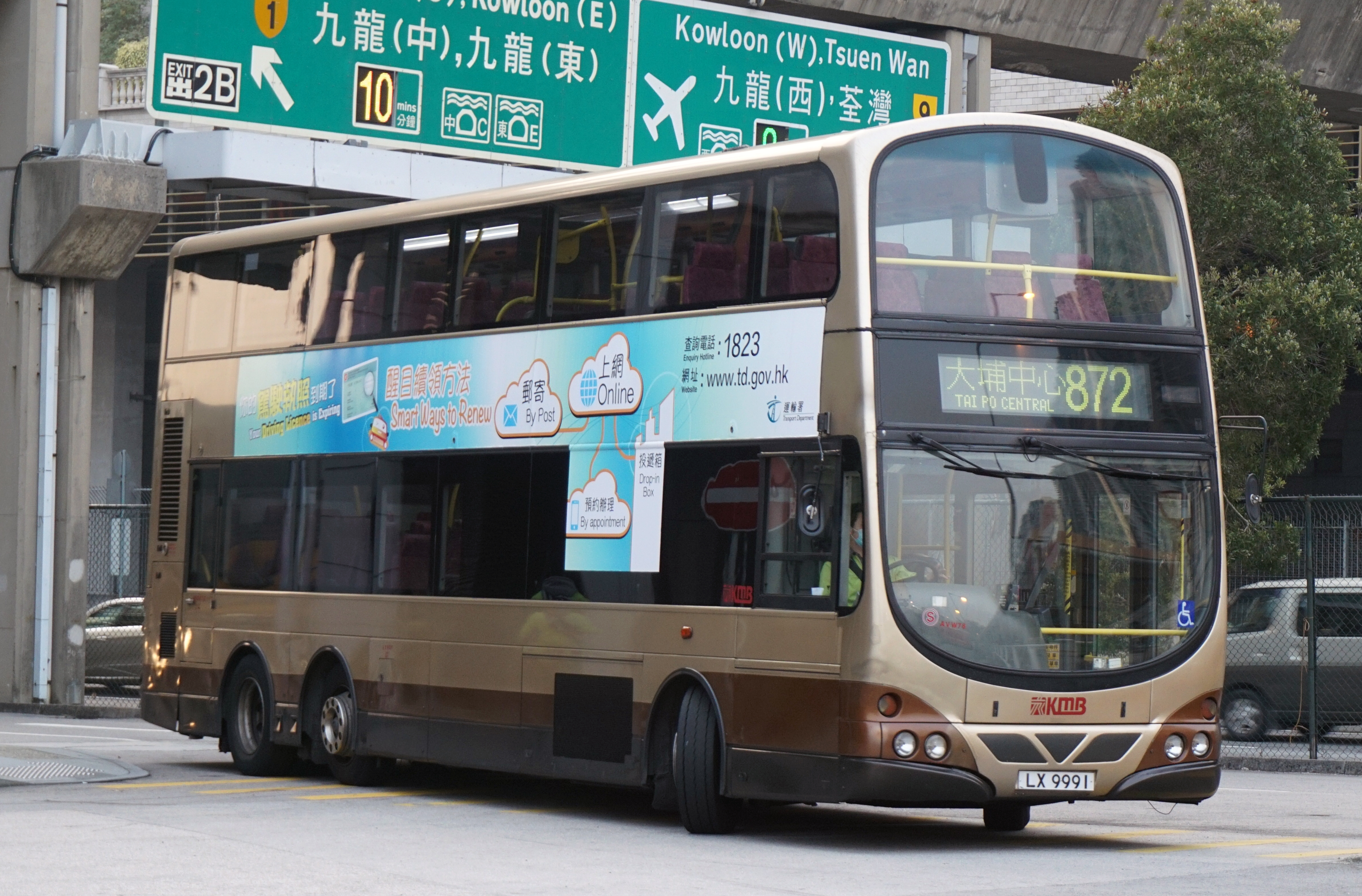
The bus involved, photographed 32 minutes prior to the accident

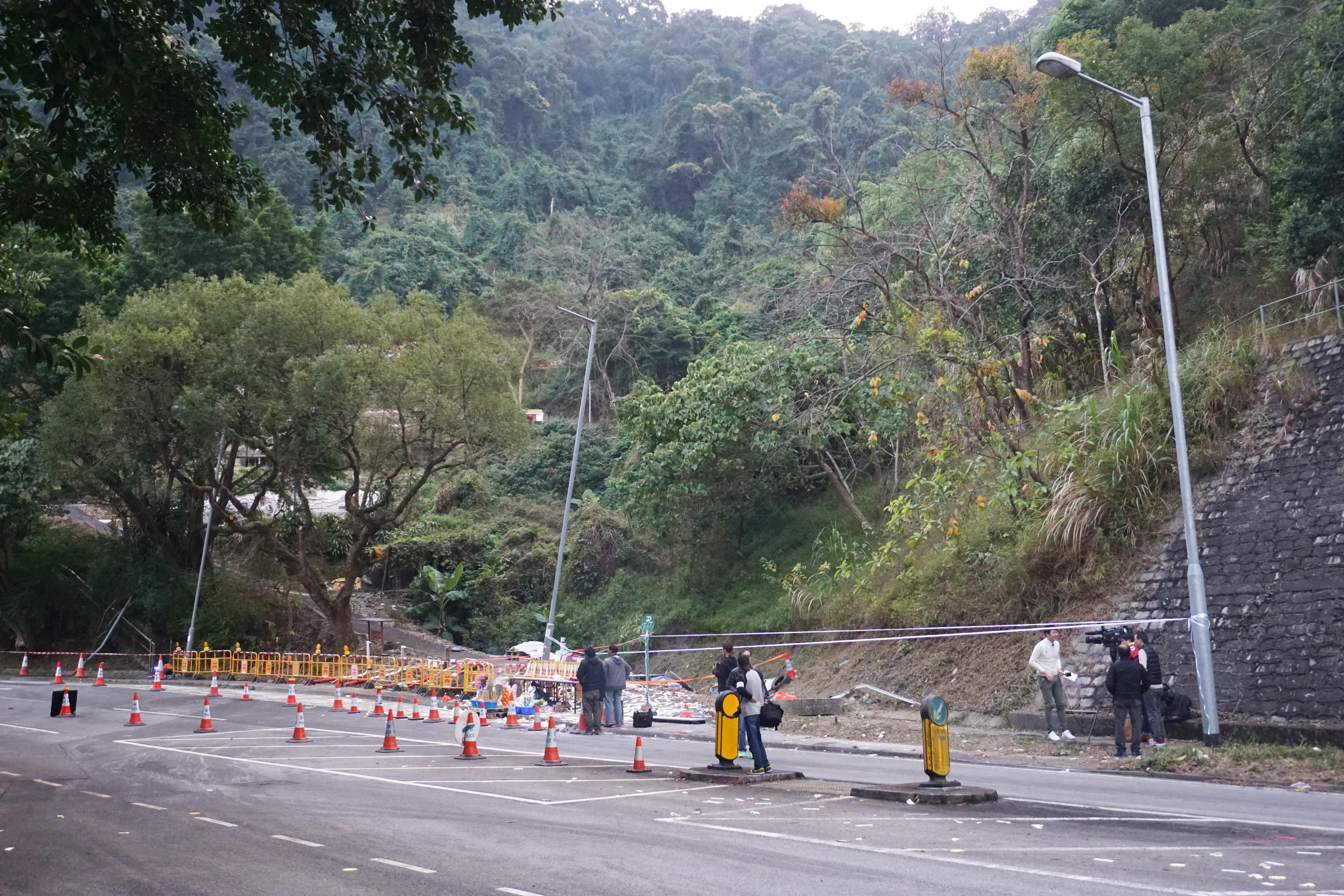
Crash site after the wreck was removed

On 10 February 2018, at approximately 18:13 HKT, a Kowloon Motor Bus (KMB) double-decker bus flipped onto its side on Tai Po Road in Tai Po, New Territories. The crash killed 19 people and injured 65.

The incident, also known as the 872 accident (Chinese: 872意外) after the number of the route the bus was traveling on, was Hong Kong's second-deadliest road traffic accident, behind a 2003 incident on Tuen Mun Road which killed 21.

In July 2020, the bus captain was sentenced to imprisonment for 14 years over the crash. In addition, he is no longer allowed to drive any vehicles.

== Incident ==
=== Crash ===
The Volvo Super Olympian bus (Wright Explorer bodied, fleet number AVW78, registration number LX 9991) was running on route 872, a special route operated only on horse racing days. It was travelling from Sha Tin Racecourse, following a race day, to Tai Po Centre in Tai Po New Town.

Before boarding the bus, the driver chatted with a bus fan for some time. It was reported that the bus departed the racecourse 10 minutes late, leading some passengers to scold and quarrel with the driver. Passengers said the driver then became frustrated, and "drove really fast as if he was throwing a tantrum". They said he drove "very, very fast" the whole time, without slowing for turns.

As the bus was travelling on a downhill section of Tai Po Road, near Tai Po Mei village, it came to a bend where it flipped onto its left side, hitting a lamp post and destroying the Tai Po Mei bus stop. Eighteen people were killed at the scene.

=== Immediate aftermath ===
Immediately after the crash, some passengers tried to attack the driver. Fire services officers had to cut into the bus to rescue those trapped inside, an operation that took about 85 minutes. A makeshift morgue was set up at the roadside.

The death toll rose to 19 when a man died at 4:00 am the following morning at United Christian Hospital. Excluding this person, the accident left 65 people injured.

The affected section of Tai Po Road was closed for 12 hours following the incident. Other bus routes normally plying the route were diverted to Tolo Highway. The road was partly closed again the following afternoon to accommodate a ceremony attended by about 200 mourners, government officials, and KMB management.

== Response ==
=== Kowloon Motor Bus ===
The bus company posted on their Facebook page: "KMB expresses extreme regret and sadness at this accident, and deeply apologises." The company said it would give HK$80,000 to every affected family, and would form a committee to investigate the accident.

On 15 February 2018, in response to concerns raised by trade unions and the public (see below), KMB announced that it had ceased giving shifts to part-time drivers who worked fewer than 18 hours per week. This comprises about 209 of around 360 part-time drivers. It also said it had suspended the hiring of new part-time drivers.

On 18 February 2018, service on KMB route 872 resumed. To provide passengers peace of mind, the route was changed to only use single-decker buses. Also, a new express route 872X commenced, which bypasses Tai Po Road (where the crash occurred) and uses Tolo Highway instead.

According to The Independent Review Committee on Hong Kong's Franchised Bus Service, formed after the accident, KMB was considering spending HK$200 million to install seatbelts on older KMB buses in Hong Kong to increase bus safety. They have also tested an anti-drowsiness device for drivers which will use facial recognition software to detect the driver's level of alertness. In addition, KMB announced that 160 buses equipped with electronic stability systems and speed-limiting devices were expected to arrive in Hong Kong by August 2018. KMB has also tried reducing the special shifts of drivers from 14 hours to 13.

=== Hong Kong government ===
On the night of the accident, chief executive Carrie Lam visited victims at the Prince of Wales Hospital and announced that a separate commission of inquiry, led by a judge, would be set up to investigate the safety of the public transport system, in particular, of the public buses. She also said that relatives of the dead would each receive $300,000, while the injured would receive between $150,000 and $250,000 each. These funds have been provided by various charitable organisations including the Jockey Club, Tung Wah Group of Hospitals, Yan Chai Hospital, and Pok Oi Hospital.

The government also announced that flags would be flown at half-mast, and the annual Lunar New Year fireworks over Victoria Harbour, scheduled for 17 February, would be cancelled in an expression of grief.

On 13 March 2018, the Vice President of the Court of Appeal, Mr Justice Michael Lunn, was named as chairman of the three-member commission of inquiry.

=== Unions ===
The day after the crash, the Motor Transport Workers General Union (affiliated with the Federation of Trade Unions) held a press conference to criticise working conditions at KMB. They said that poor pay has led to a shortage of drivers, and alleged that drivers are not provided enough training nor permitted sufficient rest. Similarly, the Confederation of Trade Unions picketed the company's headquarters in protest of alleged low salaries. Kwok Wai-kwong, chairman of the KMB Staff Union, criticised the company's practice of hiring part-time drivers. He characterised them as amateurish, and said the company required they only train for two days (while full time drivers must complete 18 days of training). KMB driver Yip Wai Lam started an impromptu strike with several drivers at KMB on the following Sunday, which brought the bus company to the table for negotiation over working hours and conditions.

=== Public ===
The day following the crash, there were hours-long queues at Hong Kong Red Cross blood donation centres as thousands of Hongkongers sought to help those injured in the accident. The Causeway Bay Donor Centre extended its operating hours to accommodate the queue. The Red Cross announced that it would keep 12 blood donation centres open through the Lunar New Year holiday.

== Driver ==
A KMB manager stated that the 30-year-old bus driver, Chan Ho-ming, had been employed with the company since 2014. Media reported that he had worked part time since 2017 and was not assigned to a specific route, but ordinarily worked on Saturdays and Sundays driving special routes. He survived the accident and was arrested for dangerous driving causing death and dangerous driving causing grievous bodily harm. Chan appeared at the Fanling Magistrates' Court on 13 February 2018. He did not enter a plea, was denied bail, and was remanded in custody. In October his charges were upgraded to include multiple counts of manslaughter; a conviction would be punishable by life imprisonment.

The company initially said Chan had a "good driving record", had driven the route before, and had received enough rest before his shift. Contradicting KMB's claim that he possessed a good safety record, media alleged that he had been at the helm of another KMB bus that crashed in Kwai Chung on 2 August 2014. While making a turn at speed, his Dennis Trident 3 double-decker was seriously damaged after it slammed into kerbside railings and a structural column in the bus terminus at Kwai Fong station. A passenger and a pedestrian were injured. KMB subsequently admitted that Chan had been involved in this accident. He was convicted of careless driving, had driving offence points deducted, and had been fined. The company afterward deemed him fit to continue working. Chan has been reported to be a bus fan active on online bus enthusiast communities. A friend stated that he possessed a "bad driving attitude".

In 2020, the bus captain pleaded guilty to 19 counts of manslaughter and 19 counts of dangerous driving causing serious bodily harm to another person, totaling 38 charges. The magistrate accused the defendant of being selfish and ignoring the safety of passengers. On 7 July 2020, Chan was sentenced to 14 years in prison and had all his driving licences revoked for life.

== Investigation ==
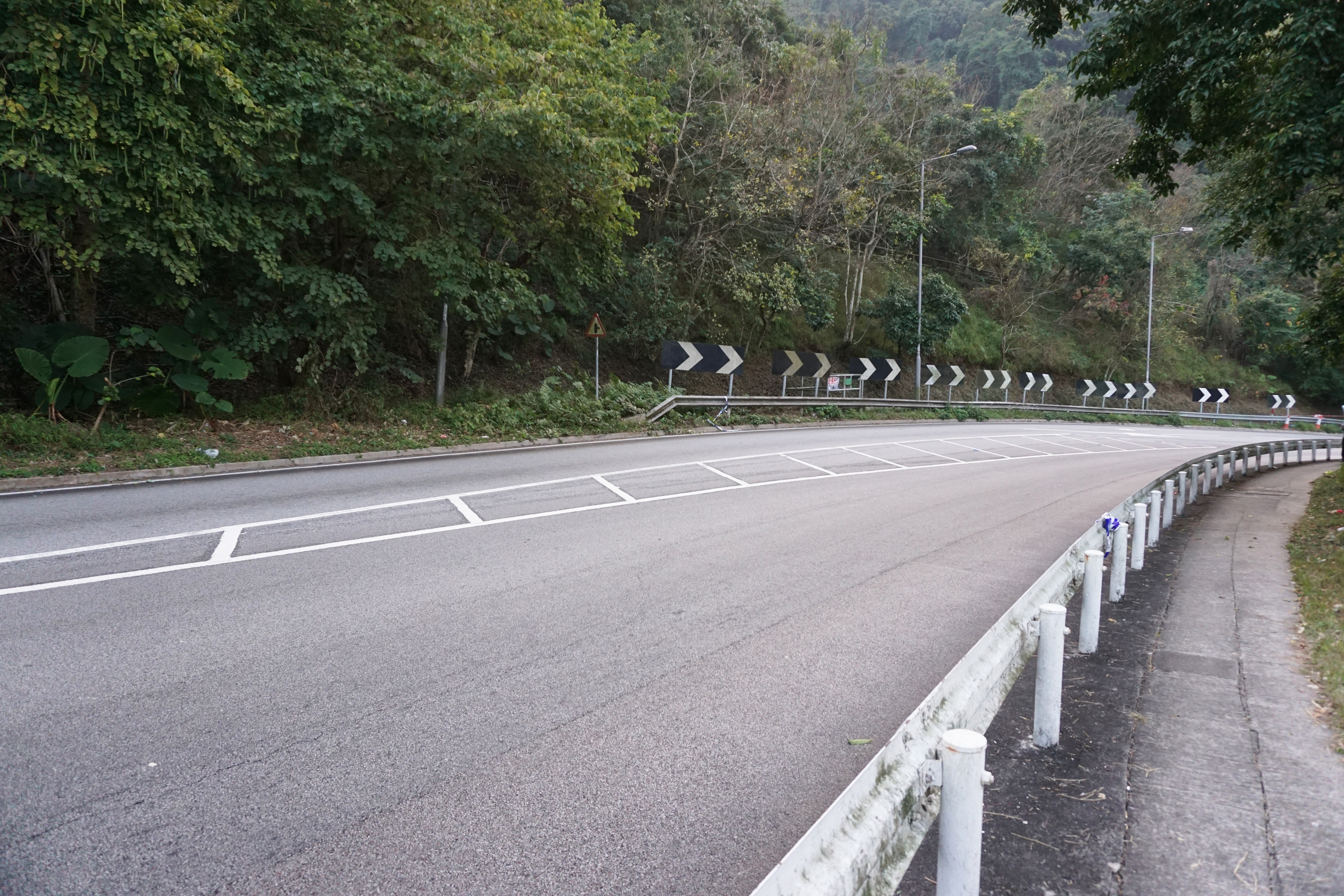
A view of the downhill approach to the crash site

Immediately following the crash, passengers told local media that the driver was exceeding the speed limit. The police said they also suspected that the bus was speeding. They said that alcohol was not a factor in the accident.

A passenger on the bus stated that "he felt as if the bus was travelling at 80 to 100 kilometres per hour (50 to 62 mph)". Investigator Lo Kok-keung estimated the bus entered the bend at up to 68 km/h (42 mph), and said a safe travelling speed for the turn would be 30 to 50 km/h (19 to 31 mph).

The wrecked bus was removed from the site on the morning of 11 February and was transported to Tai Lam Chung for examination. The police said that the investigation would cover the speed, the mechanical condition of the bus, and the psychological state of the driver. The crash was investigated by the Regional Crime Unit, New Territories North.

== See also ==
- Bus services in Hong Kong
- Transport in Hong Kong
