= Multiple-vehicle collision =

Road traffic accident involving many vehicles

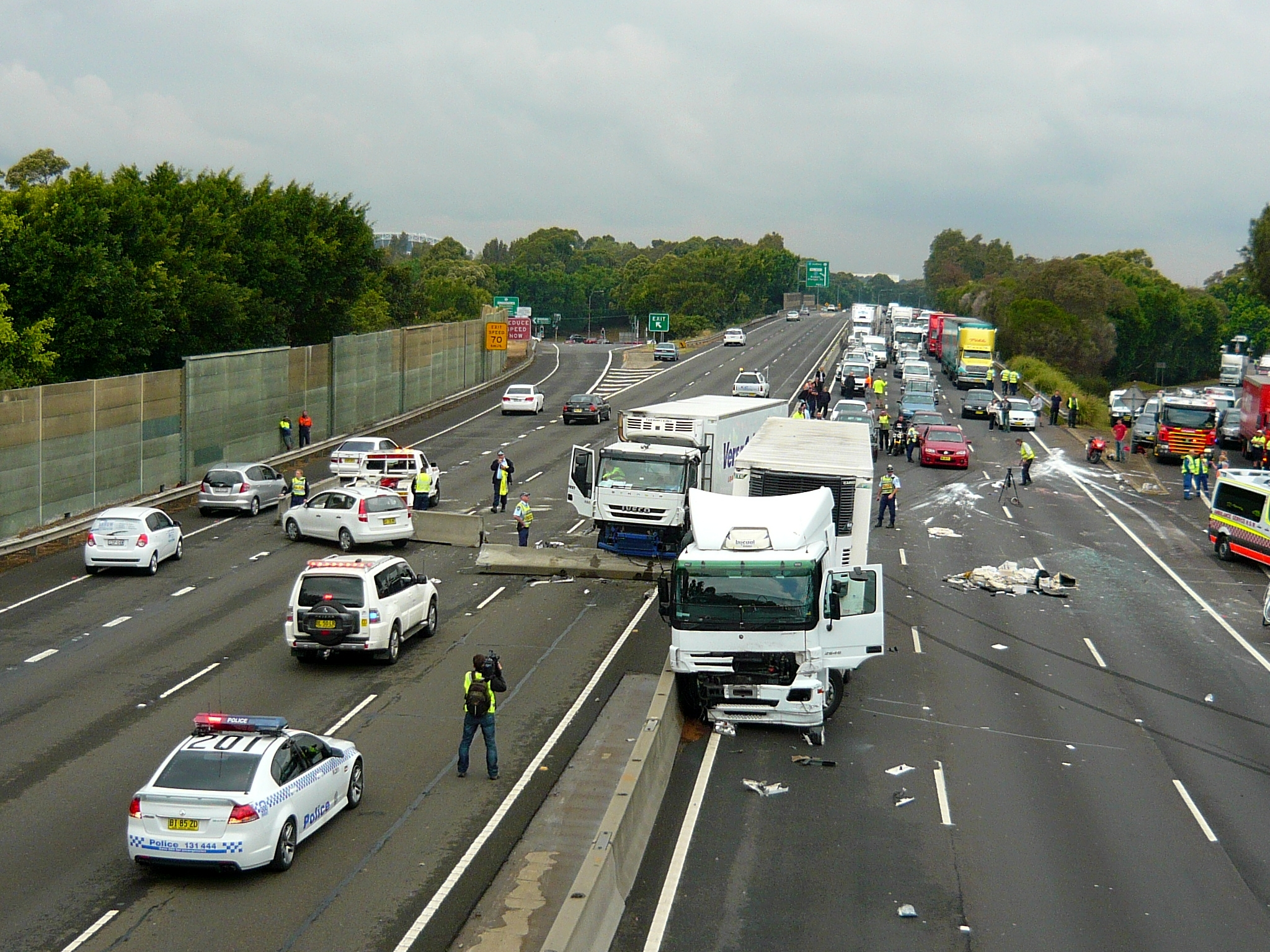
Aftermath of a multi-vehicle collision on the M4 Motorway in Sydney, Australia

A multiple-vehicle collision (colloquially known as a pileup or multi-car collision), is a road traffic collision involving many vehicles. Generally occurring on high-capacity and high-speed routes such as freeways, they are one of the deadliest forms of traffic collisions. The most disastrous pileups have involved more than a hundred vehicles.

== Terminology ==
A chain collision can be defined as "an accident involving three or more vehicles in which one vehicle has only rear impact damage (i.e., the "lead" vehicle); one vehicle has only frontal damage; and all other vehicles have frontal and rear impact damage (these are the "middle" vehicles)".

== Statistics ==
=== British statistics ===
In Great Britain, statistics are available on the number of vehicles involved in crashes.

- In 2013, there were: 42,487 single-vehicle crashes, 82,429 dual-vehicle crashes, and 13,744 crashes involving three or more vehicles (10%) for a total of 138,660 reported crashes. In crashes with three or more vehicles, there were 228 motorists killed and 19 pedestrians killed.
- In 2020, there were: 25,730 single-vehicle crashes, 57,392 dual-vehicle crashes, and 8,077 crashes involving three or more vehicles (9%) for a total of 91,199 reported crashes. In crashes with three or more vehicles, there were 200 motorists (18% of all motorists) and 17 pedestrians (5% of all pedestrians) killed.
View source data.

=== American statistics ===
In America, statistics are available from the Fatality Analysis Reporting System (FARS).

- Between 2005 and 2021, there were 138 fatal crashes that involved at least ten vehicles.
- Crashes involving more than ten vehicles are over 100 times more likely to result in the deaths of at least five people compared to fatal crashes involving fewer than five vehicles.
- More fatal pile-ups occur between 7 a.m. and 8 a.m. than during any other single hour. However, the most frequent time for these accidents is during the transition from late afternoon to early evening, with one-third of the pile-ups happening between 2 p.m. and 7 p.m.

== Causes ==
Pile-ups generally occur in low-visibility conditions as drivers on freeways are following too closely and unable to adjust to road conditions.

Chain-reaction crashes can also occur in conditions of good visibility, when black ice or other road hazards are encountered unexpectedly as drivers round a curve or crest a hill.

Multiple vehicle collisions can also occur when a third vehicle is too close to an initial collision to avoid hitting one or both of the vehicles. Due to the high traffic speeds on the road, if one car develops a problem and suddenly halts, ones behind it cannot stop in time and may hit it. Considering that these roads often have high traffic volumes, more cars are forced into braking and skidding, darting into other lanes and in front of other traffic; more vehicles become involved, creating a chain reaction effect.

Determining the cause of such collisions is difficult for investigators and it is often impossible to tell if negligence caused the crash. In spite of their frequency, little formal research has been done in the United States regarding their causes.

== Effects ==
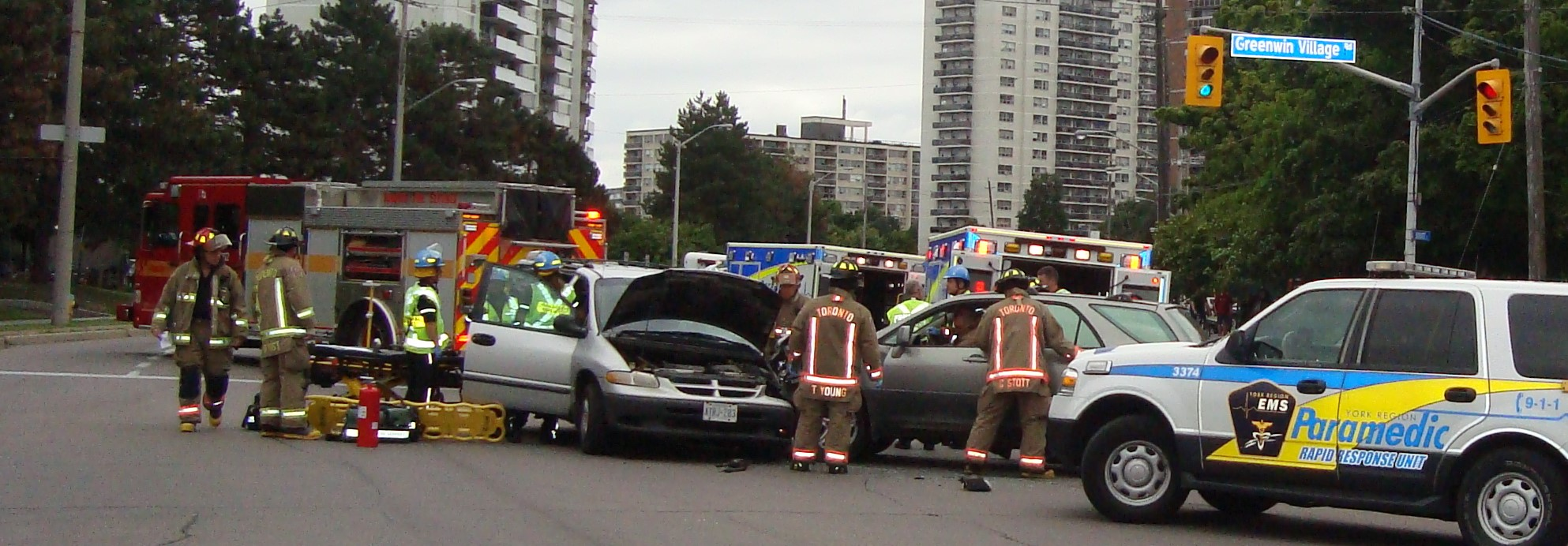
Emergency services work on the scene of a multiple vehicle collision in Toronto.

Multiple-vehicle collisions are particularly deadly as the mass of crumpled vehicles makes escape for survivors difficult. Even if survivors are able to exit their vehicles, other cars may strike them. Individual vehicles in a multiple-vehicle collision are often hit multiple times at high speed, increasing the risk of injury to passengers who may have survived the first impact with the benefit of now-discharged protective airbags. Collisions after the initial collision may occur from the side of the vehicle, where the passenger compartment is more vulnerable.

A fire in one part of the collision can quickly spread via spilled gasoline and cover the entire crash area. Multiple-vehicle collisions can also overwhelm local emergency services making speedy rescues more difficult. If the collision takes place in a remote area, getting medical help to the scene can be difficult.

The destruction and intense heat of fires can also damage roadways, particularly by melting and burning the asphalt or spalling concrete surfaces. The structural steel of bridges and overpasses can also be weakened by the heat. A fiery pileup inside a tunnel is the most serious, as there is little means to escape the poisonous fumes and the confined heat may damage structural supports.

The large scale of these collisions can close highway routes for several days, or even longer if highway support structures are damaged.

== Avoidance ==
A NHTSA report suggests that a vehicle fit with a center high-mounted stop lamps has 23.7% less risk to be involved as a lead vehicle in a chain collision while it has 16.0% less risk to be involved as a middle vehicle in such a chain collision.

== France ==
In the French ASFA motorway network, out of all vehicle crashes with injuries, single vehicle crashes make up 42% of the total, dual vehicle crashes make up 41%, and crashes involving three or more vehicles make up 17%.

== Korea ==
On Korean expressways, chain crashes represent 10.7% of crashes with injuries involving truck drivers. On Korean rural roads, chain crashes represent 0.6% of crashes with injuries involving truck drivers.

== Major pileups ==
This list contains pileups of at least 40 vehicles or other incidents notable for reasons other than the number of vehicles involved.

| Date | Location | Killed | Injured | Vehicles | Details |
|---|---|---|---|---|---|
| 31 October 1965 | United States (Greater Los Angeles area, California) | 0 | 28 | 100+ | A fog bank settled over Santa Ana Freeway and caused a chain reaction collision involving more than 100 cars in both directions. The crash caused 28 injuries. Two more separate chain collisions involving an additional 50 cars (also attributed to fog) occurred on Harbor Freeway that same day. |
| 29 November 1971 | United Kingdom (Luton, England) | 7 | 42 | 70 | Due to fog, there was a pileup on the M1 just north of the A505 junction near Luton, United Kingdom. Fog warning lights, switched on at the advice of motorway patrols, were not active at the time of the pileup. 26 miles of the M1 motorway were closed for several hours in both directions. |
| 24 October 1973 | United States (Secaucus, New Jersey) | 9 | 40+ | 65 | The heavy fog created a rapid reduction in visibility along the toll plaza stretch of the New Jersey Turnpike near Secaucus along the bank of the Hackensack River. Semi-trucks, cars, and even a coach bus were involved in the crashes. Smoke from a nearby fire also contributed to the low visibility. Local police and New Jersey State Police helped out in the search and rescue efforts. |
| 7 April 1982 | United States (Berkeley Hills, California) | 7 | 2 | 5+ | An accident involving a gasoline tanker truck in the third (then-northernmost) bore set off the Caldecott Tunnel fire. The accident caused major damage and the bore was closed to traffic for several months while repairs were made, with traffic temporarily reverting to the pre-third-bore configuration. During the fire, the tunnel acted as a natural chimney, venting the smoke, flames, and heat upward the eastern entrance to the tunnel. The accident and fire killed seven people, most of whom were overcome by toxic smoke. The fire occurred shortly after midnight when there were few cars in the tunnel; had it occurred during normal commute hours, hundreds could have died. |
| 31 July 1982 | France (Beaune, Côte-d'Or) | 53 | | 4 | The Beaune coach crash in France, Europe, is considered the most fatal multiple vehicle road collision in France. 53 people died, including 46 children (44 on the coach and 2 in a car). Legal consequences include the following: maximum speed limit for coaches reduced, the speed limit for all vehicles in rainy conditions reduced to 110 km/h (68 mph) on motorways and 80 km/h (50 mph) on other roads; transporting groups of children forbidden during the busy weekends of late July and early August; and all heavy vehicles (such as HGVs and coaches) must be equipped with a mechanical speed-limitation device, and it is strictly forbidden for the user to tamper with or modify this device in any way. |
| 12 March 1990 | United States (Green Bay, Wisconsin) | 3 | 30 | 52 | Heavy fog led to a fiery crash involving 52 vehicles led to three deaths and more than 30 injuries on the Interstate 43 in Green Bay, Wisconsin, United States, on the Tower Drive Bridge over the Fox River. A fog warning system was immediately installed, and bridge lighting was installed in the mid-2000s after more fog-related issues. |
| 11 December 1990 | United States (Calhoun, Tennessee) | 12 | 42 | 99 | Heavy fog caused by the neighboring Bowater paper mill led to a fiery crash involving 99 vehicles, leaving 12 dead and 42 injured on Interstate 75 in Calhoun, Tennessee, between Chattanooga and Knoxville near the Hiwassee River. The Bowater paper mill paid out more than $10M in settlements. A fog warning system has since been installed, and the highway patrol enforces speed limits aggressively. |
| 13 March 1991 | United Kingdom (Hungerford, England) | 10 | 25 | 51 | Referred to as the 1991 M4 motorway crash; heavy fog and a van driver either falling asleep or swerving to miss a pigeon in the outside lane led to a pileup and fiery crash involving 51 vehicles, leading to 10 deaths on the M4 in Hungerford, Berkshire, United Kingdom, between Membury and Hungerford. |
| 29 November 1991 | United States (Coalinga, California) | 17 | 114 | 104 | A dust storm led to a pileup on Interstate 5 in Coalinga, California, involving 104 vehicles, leading to 17 deaths and 114 injuries. |
| 22 April 1992 | United States (Shenandoah Valley, Virginia) | 2 | 40 | 60 | Fog led to a pileup on Interstate 64 in Virginia near Afton Mountain, involving 60 vehicles, leaving two dead and 40 injured. |
| 10 November 1993 | France (Mirambeau, Charente-Maritime). | 15 | 53 | 57 | On the A10 autoroute in Mirambeau, France, a 57-vehicle pile-up killed 15. The Orsec-Novi plan was raised. |
| 2 December 1994 | United States (San Antonio, Texas) | 0 | 67 | 127 | Blinding glare and rain-slicked roads caused a 127-vehicle pileup on Interstate 35 in San Antonio, Texas, leading to 67 injuries. |
| 20 March 1995 | United States (Mobile, Alabama) | 1 | 90 | 200 | Fog caused an accident on Interstate 10 in Mobile, Alabama, United States, involving 200 vehicles, leading to one death and 90 injuries. |
| 27 February 1996 | Belgium (Nazareth) | 10 | 80 | 200 | Fog caused an accident on E17 motorway near Nazareth, Belgium. |
| 10 March 1997 | United Kingdom (Bromsgrove, England) | 3 | 60 | 160 | Referred to as the 1997 M42 motorway crash: fog caused a crash in the United Kingdom, involving 160 vehicles, leading to three deaths and 60 injuries. |
| 31 December 1998 | United States (Grayling, Michigan) | 1 | 39 | 114 | On a snow-slicked section of N/B Interstate-75 in central Michigan, just north of Grayling, 114 cars crashed during whiteout conditions, killing one and injuring 39. |
| 3 September 1999 | Canada (Essex County, Ontario) | 8 | 45 | 87 | Dense fog and tailgating causes an 87-vehicle pile-up, killing 8, injuring 45 more on Highway 401 in Essex County, Ontario, Canada, just east of Windsor. |
| 22 November 1999 | United States (Golden, Colorado) | 2 | 29 | 83 | On Interstate 70 in Golden, Colorado, United States, a car spun out in the westbound lanes in heavy snow and fog and was then hit by other vehicles as it attempted to resume westbound travel. |
| 5 November 2000 | Nigeria (Ifẹ) | 96–200 | | 115 | In Ife, Nigeria, a tanker truck crashed into a traffic jam and exploded. The death toll is disputed, as 96 bodies were recovered in the crash, but some believe the true death toll to be as high as 200. |
| 22 February 2001 | United States (Stafford County, Virginia) | 1 | dozens | 196 | A snowstorm whiteout caused an accident on Interstate 95 in Stafford County, Virginia, United States, involving 116 vehicles plus two others nearby totaling 80 more. |
| 5 February 2002 | United States (Fresno County, California) | 2 | dozens | 87 | Annual tule fog caused visibility to drop to under 50 feet in the morning commute hours on California State Route 99 near Selma, California, resulting in the crash. This accident was made up of 2 chain-reaction crashes, a massive 63-car pileup and a 24-car pileup just ten minutes later. |
| 14 March 2002 | United States (Catoosa County, Georgia) | 4 | 39 | 125 | Sudden fog caused a pileup on Interstate 75 in Catoosa County, Georgia, United States, involving 125 vehicles and killing four people. |
| 11 October 2002 | United States (Sheboygan County, Wisconsin) | 10 | 36 | 50 | Dense fog caused a collision on Interstate 43 in Sheboygan County, Wisconsin, just north of the Ozaukee-Sheboygan County line, involving 50 vehicles. It is considered the worst multiple-vehicle collision in Wisconsin history. |
| 3 November 2002 | United States (Los Angeles County, California) | 0 | 41 | 216 | Dense fog caused an accident on Interstate 710 in Los Angeles County, California, United States involving around 200 vehicles. |
| 5 November 2002 | France (Coulombiers, Vienne) | 10 | 39 | 58 | On the A10 autoroute, Coulombiers, two HGV drivers, one British and one Russian, did not comply with speed regulations, going up to 140 km/h when speed was limited to 50 km/h due to fog; the Orsec-Novi plan was raised. |
| 5 February 2003 | Poland (Swarzędz, Greater Poland Voivodeship) | 0 | 31 | 100+ | Dense fog and excessive speed caused a pileup on the then national road 2 between the town of Swarzędz and village of Paczkowo, Greater Poland Voivodeship, Poland, involving over 100 vehicles, leaving 31 people injured. |
| 7 February 2003 | United States (Berrien County, Michigan) | 1 | 47 | 80 | Lake-effect snow caused a pileup on Interstate 94 in Berrien County, Michigan, involving 80 vehicles (initially reported as 75). |
| 23 May 2003 | United States (Garrett County, Maryland) | 2 | 64 | 90 | Heavy fog caused a crash near the Interstate 68 cut on Big Savage Mountain in Garrett County, Maryland, involving approximately 90 vehicles. |
| 6 January 2004 | United States (Centre County, Pennsylvania) | 6 | 17 | 50 | Due to poor visibility during a white out snow squall, on Interstate 80 in Centre County, Pennsylvania, an accident involving around 50 vehicles left six dead and 17 injured. |
| 12 January 2005 | United States (Ingham County, Michigan) | 2 | 35 | 200 | Dense fog caused a pileup on Interstate 96 in Ingham County, Michigan, United States, involving around 200 vehicles, leaving two dead and 35 injured. |
| 17 February 2006 | Canada (Embrun, Ontario) | 5 | 15 | 38 | Highway 417 in Embrum, Ontario, approximately 38 vehicles collided due to reduced visibility and snow squall conditions, killing 5 and injuring 15. |
| 5 November 2007 | United States (Fresno, California) | 2 | dozens | 108 | Tule fog led to an accident on Highway 99 south of Fresno, California, United States, involving 108 vehicles, with two dead and dozens of injuries. |
| 6 January 2008 | United States (Madison, Wisconsin) | 2 | | 100 | On I-90 near Madison, Wisconsin, two people are killed as there was a 100-vehicle pileup. |
| 9 January 2008 | United States (Polk County, Florida) | 4 | 38 | 70 | Four people were killed and as many as 38 were injured in a major pileup on Interstate 4 in north central Florida involving 70 vehicles, as fog mixed with smoke from a controlled fire led to "superfog", making it almost impossible for motorists to see. |
| 20 January 2008 | Canada (near Toronto, Ontario) | | | 100 | More than 100 vehicles crashed into each other on Highway 400 near Toronto due to bad weather conditions. |
| 11 March 2008 | United Arab Emirates (Ghantoot, Abu Dhabi) | 3 | 277 | 60 | At 6.39 am a series of vehicle crashes occurred, involving cars, SUVs, busses, and trucks, because of heavy fog on the Abu Dhabi-Dubai highway near Ghantoot, Abu Dhabi, in the United Arab Emirates, leading to the worst ever crash and multi-vehicle pileup in the country's history. According to Dubai-based Gulf News and Reuters, the incident killed 3 people and injured 277, involving 60 vehicles of which 25 caught fire. |
| 20 March 2008 | Czech Republic (Vysočina Region) | 0 | 33 | 231 | 231 vehicles crashed at highway D1 in Vysočina Region of the Czech Republic, injuring about 30 people, three of them seriously. Nobody was killed. |
| 25 March 2008 | Austria (between Vienna and Salzburg) | 1 | 6 | 60 | A near 60 vehicle pile-up in heavy snow on Austria's main east–west highway causes one death with six injuries. |
| 11 January 2009 | United States (Derry, New Hampshire) | | | 50+ | There was a pileup on I-93 involving "more than 50 cars..." in Derry, New Hampshire. |
| 19 July 2009 | Germany (Braunschweig, Lower Saxony) | | 66 | 259 | Dozens of people were injured, 10 critically, when 259 vehicles were involved in a series of related pile-ups due to heavy rain on the German Autobahn A2 near Braunschweig in Lower Saxony. |
| 13 December 2009 | United States (Shelton, Connecticut) | | 52 | 56 | 56 cars involved in a pile-up on Route 110 in Shelton, Connecticut, due to freezing rain and black ice resulted in 46 injuries and six hospitalizations, but no deaths or life-threatening injuries. |
| 23 December 2009 | United Kingdom (Multiple locations on the M27 motorway; Hampshire, England) | | 36 | 43 | Severe black ice, freezing fog, and deep snow led to a pileup on the M27 motorway westbound at Rownhams services involving 20 vehicles, and another pileup eastbound between J7 for Hedge End and Botley and J8 for Bursledon and Netley involving 23 vehicles. |
| 10 February 2010 | United States (Williamsburg, Virginia) | | 7 | 50 | Near Williamsburg, Virginia, whiteout conditions around 9:00 am led to a fifty-car pileup on a stretch of westbound I-64. The collision took hours to clear, and seven people suffered minor injuries requiring hospitalization. |
| 14 February 2010 | United States (Multiple locations in the Kansas City Metropolitan Area) | | 13 | 140 | Whiteout conditions caused several pileups involving 140 vehicles, including two Greyhound buses, in the Kansas City area. The largest pileup along I-70 and K-7 near the city of Bonner Springs, Kansas, involved 40 vehicles. No fatalities or critical injuries were reported. The collision closed I-70 for several hours so emergency workers and crews could clean up the area. The same day, also in the Kansas City metro area, a separate pileup also caused by whiteout conditions involving at least 20 vehicles closed parts of I-35 near 87th Street. No fatalities or serious injuries were reported there as well. The collisions sent 13 people to area hospitals. |
| 16 November 2010 | United States (Carroll County, Virginia) | 2 | 16 | 75 | Heaving fog resulting in zero visibility led to crashes on Interstate 77 in Carroll County, Virginia, in both the northbound and southbound lanes between mile markers 4 & 7 in the area of Fancy Gap, with a total of 75 vehicles involved. |
| 8 April 2011 | Germany (Rostock) | 10 | 74 | 80+ | A sandstorm caused an 80-car pileup on Autobahn 19 near Rostock, Germany, in both directions, leading to 10 dead and 74 injured. |
| 15 September 2011 | Brazil (São Paulo) | 1 | 49 | 300 | Heavy fog led to a collision on Rodovia dos Imigrantes at São Paulo, Brazil, involving around 300 vehicles, leading to several injuries and one person dead. |
| 4 November 2011 | United Kingdom (Taunton, England) | 7 | 51 | 34 | Dense fog caused a multiple-vehicle collision occurred on the M5 motorway near Taunton, Somerset, in South West England. The crash involved dozens of cars and articulated lorries; a large fireball ensued. It was concluded that the cause of the crash was dense fog. |
| 1 December 2011 | United States (Sumner County, Tennessee) | 1 | 16–18 | 176 | "Heavy, heavy fog" led to three separate chain-reaction crashes on Tennessee State Route 386 (Vietnam Veterans Boulevard) and Saundersville Road near Hendersonville in Sumner County, Tennessee, United States, north of Nashville. It involved 176 vehicles, leading to one death and 16–18 injuries. A fog advisory was not in effect for the area at the time of the crashes. |
| 3 December 2011 | Turkey (Büyükçekmece, near Istanbul) | 1 | 14 | 134 | Heavy fog and a slippery road led to an accident on the Istanbul Trans European Motorway involving 134 cars with one dead and 14 injured. |
| 5 December 2011 | Japan (Shimonoseki, Yamaguchi Prefecture) | 0 | 10 | 14 | A slippery road caused a pileup in the Chugoku expressway in Shimonoseki, Japan, and injured 10 people. It is believed to be one of the most expensive pileups, having 8 Ferraris, 3 Mercedes-Benz, a Lamborghini, and 2 Toyota Prius being involved in the crash. |
| 29 December 2011 | United States (New Orleans, Louisiana) | 2 | 59 | 40 | Heavy fog and smoke from a nearby ongoing marsh fire in New Orleans East led to a pileup on I-10 in New Orleans, Louisiana, with about 40 vehicles involved and at least 50 injuries (22 serious). |
| 29 January 2012 | United States (Gainesville, Florida) | 11 | 18 | 16 | A combination of fire smoke and fog ("superfog") blinded drivers and resulted in a pileup on Interstate 75 in Gainesville, Florida. |
| 3 February 2012 | Finland (Helsinki) | 0 | 40+ | 100+ | On European route E75 in Helsinki, Finland, heavy snow and icy road conditions caused accidents with more than 100 cars involved and more than 40 injured (1 critically). |
| 5 October 2012 | United States (between Sarasota County and Manatee County, Florida) | 0 | 52 | 47 | On Interstate I-75 Southbound on the University Blvd. overpass on the Sarasota/Manatee County line, Florida, white-out rain led to 12 separate crashes involving 47 vehicles. |
| 22 November 2012 | United States (Jefferson County, Texas) | 2 | 100 | 100+ | On Interstate I-10, Jefferson County, Texas, a 150-vehicle pileup in both directions due to fog leaves 2 dead, 100 hurt. |
| 15 January 2013 | Sweden (Helsingborg, Scania) | 1 | 46 | 80 | On the European route E4 Klippan on Tranarp bridge near Helsingborg, southwestern Sweden, one person died and more than 40 were injured after up to 80 vehicles crashed into one another due to dense fog and slippery road conditions. |
| 21 January 2013 | United States (Cincinnati, Ohio) | 1 | 27 | 103 | On Interstate 275 in Cincinnati, Ohio, flash snowburst caused a large pileup with many injuries. A 12-year-old girl was killed. |
| 21 January 2013 | United States (Middletown, Ohio) | 0 | 9 | 52 | On Interstate 75 in Middletown, Ohio, flash snowburst caused a large pileup. Same storm as the Cincinnati 103-vehicle collision that killed a 12-year-old girl. |
| 25 January 2013 | Canada (Oshawa, Ontario) | 0 | 5 | 80 | 80-vehicle pileup occurred on Highway 401 east of Oshawa, Ontario, Canada. |
| 31 January 2013 | United States (Detroit, Michigan) | 3 | 20+ | 35+ | On Interstate 75 in Detroit, Michigan, flash snowburst caused a pileup along an urbanized section of Interstate 75 in Detroit, killing a 46-year-old Allen Park man, and two children from nearby Windsor, Ontario. |
| 31 March 2013 | United States (Carroll County, Virginia) | 3 | 25 | 95 | On Interstate 77 in Carroll County, Virginia, approximately 95 vehicles were involved in a collision on the southbound lane of I-77 near the base of Fancy Gap Mountain near Fancy Gap, Virginia. Virginia State Police say that excessive fog could be to blame for the collision. Three people were killed. |
| 5 September 2013 | United Kingdom (Kent, England) | 0 | 60 | 130+ | 60 people were injured as more than 130 vehicles were involved in a series of crashes in thick fog on the A249 Sheppey crossing in Kent, UK. |
| 3 December 2013 | Belgium (Zonnebeke, West Flanders) | 2 | 67 | 132 | One person was killed and 67 injured as 132 vehicles were involved in a triple chain collision in thick fog on the A19 in Zonnebeke, Belgium. A second person died four days later. |
| 23 January 2014 | United States (LaPorte County, Indiana) | 3 | 20+ | ~46 | Lake-effect snow caused a pileup involving more than 40 vehicles on Interstate 94 in LaPorte County, Indiana. |
| 14 February 2014 | United States (Philadelphia metropolitan area, Pennsylvania) | 0 | 30 | 100 | Up to 105 vehicles were involved in multiple collisions on the eastbound lanes of the Pennsylvania Turnpike between Willow Grove and Bensalem. One collision involved about 75 vehicles while another incident further east involved about 30 vehicles. There were a total of 30 injuries. The collisions were a result of icy conditions from a winter storm. |
| 27 February 2014 | Canada (Barrie, Ontario) | 0 | | 96 | On Ontario Highway 400 south of Barrie, 96 vehicles were involved in collisions at about 9am during a snow squall, reducing visibility to "a few feet". The incident resulted in the closure of Highway 400 between Highway 89 and Mapleview Drive. Both lanes on that stretch of highway were closed for most of the day until early evening. |
| 1 March 2014 | United States (Denver, Colorado) | 1 | 30 | 104 | Heavy snow caused a pileup involving 104 vehicles on Interstate 25 in Denver, Colorado, United States. |
| 12 March 2014 | United States (Sandusky County, Ohio) | 3 | "numerous" | 90 | Heavy snow caused two crashes involving ninety vehicles on the Ohio Turnpike (Interstate 80/90) in Sandusky County, Ohio, United States. |
| 14 October 2014 | South Africa (Alberton) | 4 | 54 | 47 | A 47-vehicle pileup occurred during morning traffic on N12 Freeway near Alberton, South Africa, heading east. Four people were confirmed dead and nine were critically injured. |
| 9 January 2015 | United States (Galesburg, Michigan) | 1 | 23 | 193 | Nearly 200 vehicles, including 76 semi trucks, were involved in a pileup on Interstate 94 near Galesburg, Michigan, amidst a heavy snowstorm that brought nearly a foot of snow to the area. One of the trucks was carrying a load of fireworks, which caught fire and exploded, injuring two firefighters. The only fatality was a 57-year-old truck driver from Quebec, Canada. |
| 18 January 2015 | United States (Upper Merion, Pennsylvania) | 1 | 30 | 60 | Icy roads led to a 60-car pileup on Interstate 76 in Upper Merion, Pennsylvania. One man was killed when he got out of his car after the collision and was hit by another car. 30 more people were injured. |
| 11 February 2015 | South Korea (Incheon) | 2 | 65 | 106 | A 106-car pileup on Yeongjong Bridge in Incheon, South Korea, killed two and injured more than 65 people. The event was caught on tape from a vehicle's dashcam. |
| 25 February 2015 | United States (Penobscot County, Maine) | 0 | 17 | 75 | A 75-car pileup on Interstate 95 in Penobscot County, Maine, United States, was noted as possibly Maine's largest single traffic collision. |
| 30 January 2016 | Slovenia (Senožeče) | 4 | 30 | 70+ | A 55-car pileup on A1 motorway near Senožeče, Slovenia killed five and injured more than 30. |
| 13 February 2016 | United States (Lebanon County, Pennsylvania) | 3 | 25+ | 50 | Icy conditions caused a pileup on the I-78 Freeway in Pennsylvania, resulting in the deaths of 3 people. 50 cars were involved and at least 25 people were injured. |
| 22 February 2016 | Norway (Eidsvåg, Bergen) | 0 | 5 | 60 | Unforeseen slippery roads during morning rush hours took motorists by surprise; there were 60 cars in the pileup on E39 near Bergen, Norway. |
| 13 March 2016 | United States (Alamance County, North Carolina) | 0 | 20 | 130 | At least 130 cars piled up on Interstate 85/Interstate 40 in Alamance County, North Carolina, United States. The crash is thought to be a result of slippery roads caused by thunderstorms in the area at the time. |
| 22 November 2016 | China (Shanxi) | 17 | 37 | 56 | Snowy road conditions on an expressway linking Beijing and Kunming in the North China province of Shanxi caused a total of 56 vehicles to crash into each other, resulting in 17 deaths. |
| 8 December 2016 | United States (Cleveland, Ohio) | 0 | 20 | 50 | A 50-vehicle pileup on Interstate 90 in Concord Township, Ohio on the east side of Cleveland, Ohio, at mile marker 202.3 (between OH-44 and Vrooman Road) happened as a result of overnight heavy lake-effect snow. It seems to have had 15 semi trucks and 35 cars involved. |
| 5 February 2018 | United States (Ames, Iowa) | 1 | 5 | 50–70 | Icy conditions led to a pileup on Interstate 35 near Ames, Iowa, involving at least 15 semi trucks and 35 cars. One fatality and five critically injured people were reported. |
| 15 February 2019 | United States (Oak Grove, Missouri) | 1 | 0 | 47 | A 47-vehicle pileup occurred on Interstate 70 near Oak Grove, Missouri, due to icy roads and white-out conditions. One fatality was reported. |
| 24 February 2019 | United States (Neenah, Wisconsin) | 1 | 71 | 119 | White-out conditions and winds in excess of 50 mph contributed to a massive vehicle pileup on Interstate 41 near Neenah, Wisconsin. It was first reported as 131 vehicles but later confirmed to be 119. The pile-up left 1 dead and 71 injured. |
| 5 March 2019 | United States (Hudson, Ohio) | 0 | 25 | ~100 | White-out conditions and icy roads caused a 90 to 100 car pileup on Route 8 northbound in Hudson, Ohio. |
| 23 March 2019 | United States (Grapevine, California) | 1 | 12 | 50 | With fog visibility of 100 feet, there was a pileup on the Southbound side of Interstate 5 South of Grapevine at Gorman School Road. A toddler passed away days later. |
| 25 April 2019 | United States (Lakewood, Colorado) | 4 | 7 | 28 | A semi driver slammed into rush hour traffic, starting a pile up and massive fire that killed four people and injured seven others in Lakewood, Colorado. |
| 22 December 2019 | United States (Williamsburg, Virginia) | 0 | 51 | 69 | Near Williamsburg, Virginia, 69 vehicles collided in foggy conditions on Interstate 64 on the westbound portion of Queens Creek Bridge. |
| 19 February 2020 | Canada (La Prairie, Quebec) | 2 | ~70 | 200+ | White-out conditions on Highway 15 caused a pile-up involving more than 200 vehicles in La Prairie, a suburb of the Canadian city of Montreal. |
| 1 March 2020 | United States (Wamsutter, Wyoming) | 3 | 30 | 120 | Near Wamsutter, Wyoming, over 100 vehicles collided in near-zero visibility conditions while semi-trailers toppled over in high winds. Vehicles were unable to stop as there was also black ice on Interstate 80 on both sides of the highway, westbound and eastbound portions between Rawlins and Wamsutter. People report being stuck on the highway for over nine hours before emergency teams were able to clear the roadway. |
| 11 February 2021 | United States (Fort Worth, Texas) | 6 | 65+ | 133 | Freezing rain resulted in 133 vehicles being involved in a crash on Interstate 35W near Fort Worth, Texas. It was the worst pile-up in Texas history with more than 65 people hospitalized and at least six people dead. Multiple people were trapped in their vehicles as well and had to be rescued. The scene of the crash spanned over 1.5 miles. |
| 19 June 2021 | United States (Butler County, Alabama) | 10 | | 18 | Rain from Tropical Storm Claudette resulted in a pile-up of 18 vehicles on the Interstate 65 in Butler County, Alabama. Ten were killed, including nine children. |
| 25 July 2021 | United States (Millard County, Utah) | 8 | >10 | 22 | A severe sandstorm resulted in a pile-up of 22 vehicles on Interstate 15 in Millard County, Utah. Eight were killed, including four children under the age of 15. |
| 7 November 2021 | Mexico (between Mexico City and Puebla) | 19 | 3 | Many | A shampoo truck smashed into cars at a toll booth on the Mexican Federal Highway connecting Mexico City with Puebla, causing a large fire. |
| 5 January 2022 | United States (Monmouth County, New Jersey) | 0 | 7 | 65 | On the workweek morning of January 5, early morning rain falling with temps below freezing led to widespread black ice across the Philadelphia and New York City metro areas. In Monmouth County, New Jersey, black ice over the Route 18/36 flyovers led to 2 car pileups in both directions. 50 vehicles were involved in the second crash and 15 were involved in the first. |
| 12 March 2022 | United States (Cumberland County, Pennsylvania) | 0 | 10 | 73 | There was a pileup on Pennsylvania Route 581 in Cumberland County, Pennsylvania, likely caused by a snow squall. |
| 17 March 2022 | United States (Charleston, Missouri) | 6 | | 47 | There was a pileup on Interstate 57 near Charleston in southeastern Missouri, caused by fog |
| 28 March 2022 | United States (Minersville, Pennsylvania) | 6 | 24 | 80 | There was a crash on Interstate 81 near Minersville, Pennsylvania, due to a snow squall |
| 4 November 2022 | United States (Denver, Colorado) | 0 | 0 | >100 | The accident occurred on 6th Avenue in Denver, Colorado, due to overnight snow and icy roads |
| 23 December 2022 | United States (Sandusky County, Ohio) | 4 | 73 | 51 | This crash occurred on the Ohio Turnpike in Sandusky County due at least partially to weather conditions from the December 2022 North American winter storm, as the area was under a level 3 snow emergency and "the crash came amid frigid temps and strong winds." This crash was still under investigation a month later. |
| 1 May 2023 | United States (Montgomery County, Illinois) | 8 | 36 | 72 | This crash occurred on Interstate 55 in Montgomery County, Illinois, due to a dust storm. |
| 23 October 2023 | United States (St. John the Baptist Parish, Louisiana) | 8 | 63 | 168 | This crash occurred on Interstate 55 in St. John the Baptist Parish, Louisiana due to a combination of heavy fog and drifting smoke from nearby marsh fires (superfog). This stretch of I-55 from Ponchatoula to Manchac is elevated to pass over swampland below, and one vehicle fell into the water and partially sunk, while over 100 motorists were left stranded before rescue services could reach the area. |
| 21 December 2024 | Brazil (Teófilo Otoni) | 39 | 7 | 3 | This crash occurred on BR-116 in Teófilo Otoni, Minas Gerais; according to the Federal Highway Police, the cause of the accident was possibly due to a fall of granite block from a B-train that hit a bus and a car. |
| 7 February 2025 | Canada (Orillia, Ontario) | 1 | 11 | 50-60 | This crash occurred on King’s Highway 11 in the city of Orillia, Ontario, after snow squalls in the area led to whiteout conditions, causing collisions between an estimated 50-60 vehicles. A 49-year-old man was killed and 11 others were hospitalized. |
| 15 February 2025 | Sweden (Uppland) | 0 | 0-120 | 100< | Two accidents occurred in Uppland on 15 February, one on the E18 in the vicinity of Grillby near Enköping and another on the E4 near Uppsala due to icy road conditions and low visibility. |
| 14 March 2025 | United States (Western Kansas) | 8 | 30+ | 71 | This crash occurred on Interstate 70 in northwestern Kansas between Colby and Goodland due to a dust storm. |
| 19 August 2025 | Afghanistan (Guzara District) | 79 | 2 | 3 | This crash occurred on the Herat–Islam Qala highway, an extension of the Afghanistan Ring Road, due to, according to local police, "excessive speed and negligence" of the overcrowded bus, which collided with a motorcycle and a truck possibly loaded with fuel, although the Taliban-ruled government has ordered an investigation. |
| 18 January 2026 | United States (Hudsonville, Michigan) | 0 | Some | About 100 | Pileup happened on Interstate 196 in suburban Grand Rapids. |
| 17 February 2026 | United States (Pueblo, Colorado) | 4 | 29 | 30+ | This crash occurred on Interstate 25 amid heavy winds blowing dirt across the roadway. |
| 17 February 2026 | United States (Paw Paw Township, Michigan) | 0 | 0 | 60 | Occurred on Interstate 94 during a whiteout. |
| 14 April 2026 | United States (Clear Creek County, Colorado) | 0 | 19 | 70 | Wintry conditions caused the pileup on Interstate 70 just east of the Eisenhower Tunnel. |
| 10 November 2026 | Bulgaria (Zimnitsa, Yambol Province) | 13 | 51 | 86 | Very dense fog reduced visibility on the A1 motorway to less than 10 meters. Following the accident, November 11 was declared a day of national mourning in Bulgaria. |

== Motorsports ==
Multiple vehicle collisions can occur in the restricted courses used in motorsports as well, most commonly after a green flag (on road courses) being waved following a warm-up lap during the start of the race. Reporters and fans apply subjective guidelines as to what threshold needs to be crossed before a simple on-track incident can be described as such. NASCAR fans, for example, talk about the "Big One", where many cars can be or are involved in a wreck while running close together.

== See also ==
- Aviation accidents and incidents
