= 2011 M5 motorway crash =

Multi-vehicle road collision in fog near Taunton, England

- The M5 on 5 November 2011, the day after the crash
- Date: 4 November 2011
- Time: 20:25 UTC
- Location: Bathpool and Creech St Michael (near Taunton), Somerset, England; 51.0239°N 3.0568°W
- Deaths: 7
- Injuries: 51
- Property damage: 34 vehicles; road surface scorched, debris fused into road surface; safety barrier damage
- Charges: 1 person charged under health and safety laws
- Verdict: Not guilty
- Location in Somerset and England

The scene of the crash on 4 November 2011

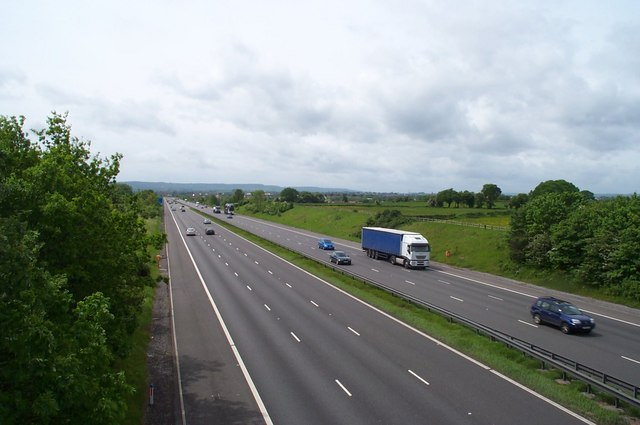
Looking southbound towards the crash site (2006)

On 4 November 2011, a multiple-vehicle collision occurred on the M5 motorway near Taunton, Somerset, in South West England. The crash involved dozens of cars and articulated lorries, and a large fireball ensued.

Seven people were killed and 51 others were injured, making the pile-up the deadliest on a British motorway since 13 people – 12 of them children – died in a minibus crash on the M40 in 1993.

In October 2012, a man who had organised and was operating a fireworks display for Guy Fawkes Night at Taunton Rugby Club's ground, which is adjacent to the motorway, was charged with seven counts of manslaughter. In January 2013, the manslaughter charges were dropped and instead he faced a single charge under health and safety laws of failing to ensure the safety of others. In December 2013 he was found not guilty of the charge.

In April 2014, the West Somerset coroner concluded that the accident was caused by dense fog, and that smoke from fireworks may have been a contributory factor, but was not the prime cause of the incident.

== Circumstances ==
At 8:25 pm on Friday 4 November 2011, 34 vehicles were involved in a pile-up on the northbound carriageway of the M5 motorway near junction 25 at Bathpool and Creech St Michael, 2.2 miles (3.5 km) northeast of Taunton. The vehicles included cars, vans and lorries, some of which exploded and started a fire. Flames rose up to 20 feet (6 m) high.

Fifty-one people were injured and seven were later confirmed dead. Sixteen casualties were treated at Musgrove Park Hospital in Taunton and 26 at Yeovil District Hospital. A surgeon was flown by helicopter from the major trauma centre at the Royal Devon and Exeter Hospital to cope with the load and the types of multi-system trauma, including multiple fractures and chest, abdominal and lung injuries.

Fifteen fire engines from Devon and Somerset Fire and Rescue Service attended, travelling from stations across the region. By 8:30 am on 6 November the emergency services had removed the vehicles from the crash site, but both carriageways of the motorway, between junctions 24 and 25, remained closed for repair work. The fatalities had not yet been formally identified.

40 metres (130 ft) of the road was damaged by fuel spillage from vehicles, and 60 metres (200 ft) of it was damaged by intense fire and explosions. Two lanes of the southbound carriageway reopened at about 5 pm on 6 November, and the motorway was fully re-opened in both directions four hours later, in time for the Monday morning rush-hour.

== Aftermath and reaction ==
External image
- Images of the crash and aftermath The Guardian

One of the lorries involved was from the food company Samworth Brothers, and another was from Samworth subsidiary Ginsters. Two of the company's drivers were killed and another was injured in the crash. On 8 November, the seven people who died were named: lorry drivers Terry Brice and Kye Thomas; father and daughter Michael and Maggie Barton; grandparents Anthony and Pamela Adams; and Malcolm Beacham.

One eyewitness described the scene of the crash, saying: "It was a horrific accident. There were a number of explosions and black smoke. It's not something you expect to see on the motorway, it was more like a scene from Afghanistan."

== Investigation ==
Initially, an assistant chief constable of Avon and Somerset Police, Anthony Bangham, told reporters that it was feared more bodies were still trapped in badly-burnt vehicles, some of which had been "burnt to the ground" and were unrecognisable. After an overnight forensic search no further bodies were found.

Police stated that a fireworks display taking place at Taunton Rugby Club just before the accident occurred was a "major line of inquiry", as "a blanket of thick smoke", which could have drifted from the display, was lying across the motorway at the time of the crash. The club's location was described as only "a few hundred metres" away from the M5. Bangham went on to say: "Accountability is clearly something we will look at ... it is a crime investigation as well as a road policing investigation." He added that driving conditions were "difficult", and that there was fog in the area at the time of the accident.

Justine Greening, the Transport Secretary, told the House of Commons that it might take weeks to determine the cause of the crash. An inquest into the deaths was opened at the Old Municipal Building in Taunton on 10 November.

A report by consultants Balfour Beatty-Mott McDonald into warning systems on the motorway in April 2010 recommended the Highways Agency automate the fog warning system. The system then in place was manually activated, using CCTV imagery or relying on the police notifying the agency. No such reports had been received on the night of the crash, and the fog warning signs had not been activated.

On 13 March 2012, following media reports that interim findings from the investigation showed fog rather than drifting smoke was to blame, police issued a statement to clarify that they had not published any conclusions to the investigation.

=== Prosecution ===
On 19 October 2012, Geoffrey Counsell, a 50-year-old man from Somerset who had provided the fireworks display at Taunton Rugby Club, was charged with seven counts of manslaughter. He appeared at Bristol magistrates' court on 12 November and was bailed until 4 December when he appeared at Bristol Crown Court for an initial preliminary hearing. Counsell was bailed again until an additional preliminary hearing at the court on 15 January 2013.

At a 15 January hearing the manslaughter charges against Counsell were dropped. He instead was charged with a single count of failing to ensure the safety of others, under health and safety laws. His trial began on 19 November and concluded on 10 December when the judge directed the jury to find him not guilty of the charge, stating that Counsell had "no case to answer" and that there was not sufficient evidence that he should have foreseen smoke from the display might drift and mix with fog to form thick smog.

After the trial Counsell criticised the police and local council for being "motivated by a desire to find someone to blame for this terrible accident, simply for the sake of it", saying that the Highways Agency, Taunton Deane Borough Council and Avon and Somerset police were all consulted before the event but "no objection of any kind was raised".

== See also ==
- List of road accidents 2010–2019
- 1991 M4 motorway crash
- 1997 M42 motorway crash
- 2010 A66 Keswick coach accident
- 2017 M1 motorway crash
- M40 Minibus Crash
