= 2004 Ingoldmells bus crash =

Motor vehicle incident in England

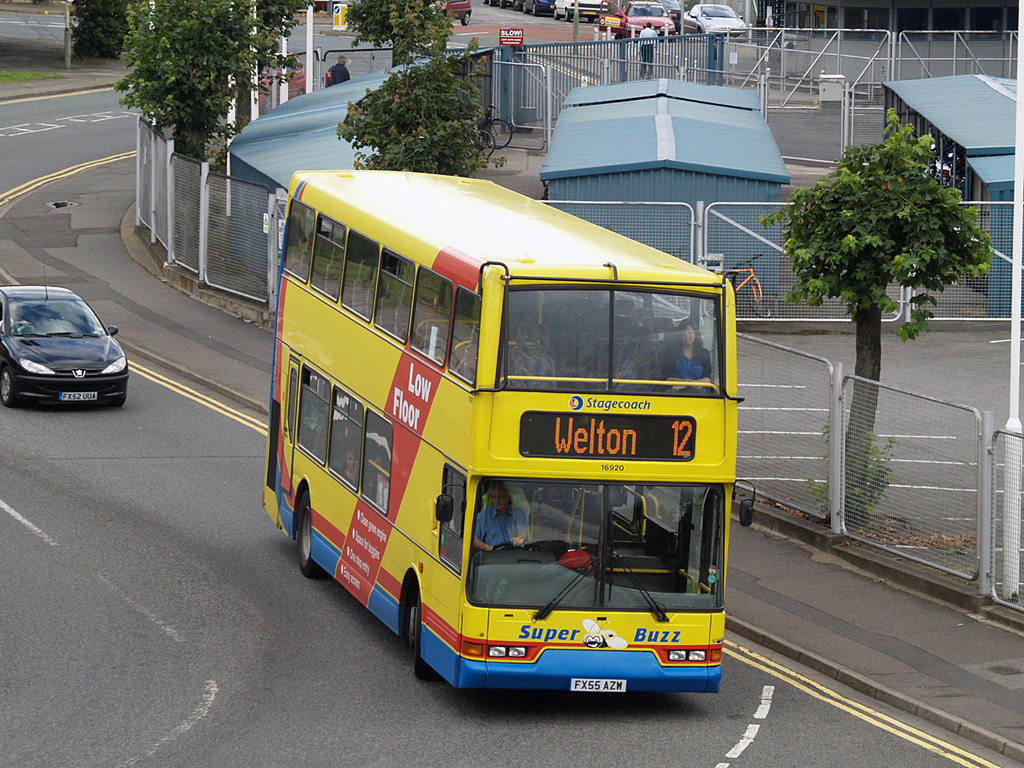
- A Volvo bus operated by Stagecoach in Lincolnshire, similar to the one involved in the accident

Details
- Date: 11 April 2004
- Location: Ingoldmells, near Skegness, Lincolnshire
- Coordinates: 53.1924°N 0.3478°E

Statistics
- Bus: Lincolnshire RoadCar; Volvo bus
- Vehicles: 2
- Deaths: 5
- Injured: 6

At around 17:00 BST on 11 April 2004, a double-decker bus was involved in a collision with a car and a number of pedestrians outside the Fantasy Island amusement park on Sea Lane in Ingoldmells, Lincolnshire, England. The collision killed five pedestrians and injured six more.

The bus, a Volvo double-decker operated by Lincolnshire RoadCar with registration number Y903 OTL, was operating a scheduled passenger service between Skegness and Chapel St Leonards when the driver, 50-year-old Stephen Topasna, dangerously drove the vehicle on Sea Lane in Ingoldmells. The bus veered onto the pavement, striking a number of pedestrians, before swerving back into the road coming to a stop after colliding with a BMW car just beyond a pelican crossing, where it had struck another group of pedestrians.

With five fatalities, the Ingoldmells bus crash was the worst incident involving a bus in the United Kingdom since the M40 minibus crash in 1993. The incident remained the deadliest bus collision in the United Kingdom during the 21st century until it was surpassed by the 2017 M1 motorway crash involving a minibus.

== Incident ==
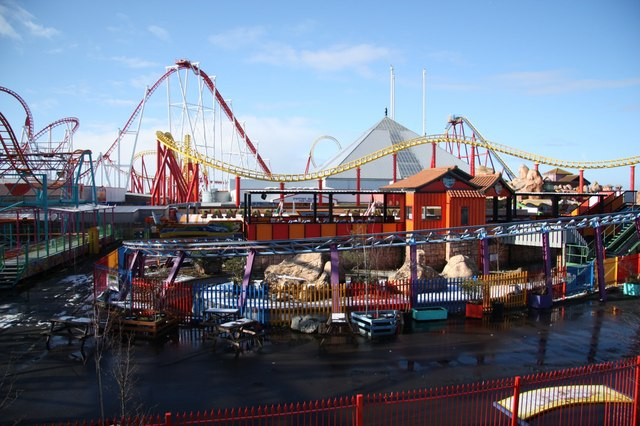
Fantasy Island amusement park in Ingoldmells, close to the site of the accident

The bus was being driven along Sea Lane in Ingoldmells, close to the Fantasy Island amusement park, at the time of the incident. Immediately prior to the collision, driver Stephen Topasna pulled the bus into a bus stop in a lay-by the side of the road in order to pick up passengers. The deaths occurred as Topasna accelerated the bus away from the lay-by. Claiming pedal confusion, which was disputed by the judge, Topasna claimed the bus inexplicably accelerated instead of braking, leading to a loss of control.

The bus continued to accelerate for 22 seconds after pulling away from the bus stop, reaching a top speed of 41 mph before losing control and mounting the pavement. Passengers on board reported hearing the driver shouting that the bus had no brakes. After losing control, the bus struck a number of pedestrians on the pavement, before veering back into the road. The bus then struck a BMW car in the road, before failing to stop in time for a pelican crossing, striking a group of pedestrians on the crossing before finally coming to a halt 176 metres after setting off.

The incident occurred on the busiest day of the year for the amusement park, and the area was busy with pedestrians. A total of five pedestrians were killed and injured were six more, including two critically. One person remained trapped underneath the bus for around half an hour after it came to a halt. Three people were pronounced dead immediately at the site of the accident; a fourth died several hours later, while a fifth pedestrian died the following day in hospital.

== Aftermath ==
The pedestrians who were killed in the incident were later named as 37-year-old Joanne Warren and her two sons, 5-year-old Jacob Warren and 4-month-old Leyton Warren, all from Leicester; and husband and wife 33-year-old Richard Rhodes and 30-year-old Paula Rhodes from Mansfield, Nottinghamshire.

Inquests into the incident were opened on 19 April. Following the collision, the section of Sea Lane on which the incident took place was pedestrianised, following numerous protests and a petition signed by 5,000 people. However, the pedestrianisation of Sea Lane was later criticised for splitting Ingoldmells in half, causing further traffic problems, which resulted in Sea Lane being reopened to traffic again, but with safety measures in place, such as a 20 mph zone, speed bumps, crash barriers and new pedestrian crossings.

A memorial stone to the victims of the accident was unveiled on 25 June 2004.

=== Charges against Lincolnshire RoadCar ===
Bus company Lincolnshire RoadCar appeared in court in connection with the incident in February 2005, potentially facing a charge of operating a vehicle with defective brakes, which the company denied.

On 8 August, Lincolnshire RoadCar were found guilty of breaching safety provisions for allowing the driver to operate the vehicle type without proper training and for operating a vehicle with faulty brakes; they were fined £2,000 at Skegness Magistrates Court. The bus had been serviced two days prior to the collision and an engineer spotted and rectified three faults with the braking system; however, they failed to rectify a fault with the brake slack adjuster. However, it was also confirmed that the faulty brakes had not caused the incident and would have had only a minor effect on the outcome of the accident.

Lincolnshire RoadCar initially planned to appeal the verdict. However, the appeal was dropped in October 2005.

=== Charges ===
Topasna was later charged with five counts of causing death by dangerous driving and one count of driving without due care and attention. Topasna admitted the charges upon appearance at Lincoln Crown Court on 18 October 2005, stating that he had mistakenly pressed the accelerator instead of the brake in a case of pedal confusion. This was disputed by the judge. On 9 November, Topasna was sentenced to five years in prison for causing each death connected with the incident.

== See also ==
- M40 minibus crash (1993)
- 2010 Keswick coach accident
- 2019 Totnes bus crash
