= 2026 Trakia motorway crash =

Multiple-vehicle collision near Yambol, Bulgaria

- Date: 10 November 2026
- Time: c. 07:00 (UTC+2)
- Location: Near Zimnitsa, Yambol Province, Bulgaria; 42°33′19.4106″N 26°34′1.74″E
- Deaths: 13
- Injuries: 51

On 10 November 2026, at around 07:00 (EET), 86 vehicles got into two different multiple-vehicle collisions on the Trakia motorway in Bulgaria, which connects the cities of Burgas and Sofia. The incident happened near the village of Zimnitsa in Yambol Province. Twelve people died and fifty-one others were injured.

== Incident ==
At 07:10 on 10 November 2026, two calls were received via the 112 emergency telephone number regarding two separate multi-vehicle collisions on the Trakia motorway. A total of 86 vehicles were involved, including over 20 trucks. The first collision, in the direction of Burgas, involved 63 vehicles, while the second, in the lanes heading toward Sofia, involved 23.

According to drivers, police, fire, and emergency medical teams arrived at the scene, located at the 289th kilometer of the motorway near the Zimnitsa junction, in under 10 minutes. The director of the Yambol Regional Directorate of the Ministry of Interior, Senior Commissioner Dobrin Dimitrov, confirmed that all available police units were deployed; additionally, 15 fire service teams comprising 61 personnel worked on rescue operations and clearing the roadway. Military personnel and teams from the Military Medical Academy also joined the response efforts.

At 08:10, the BG-Alert system was activated to issue a warning regarding the incident.

== Victims ==
Initially, media outlets reported 12 fatalities; however, the Ministry of Health subsequently clarified that 11 people were initially killed. Ten of them died at the scene, while an eleventh person succumbed to their injuries in the hospital. All of the casualties were in the lanes heading toward Burgas. Two days later, on 12 November, a twelfth person died in a hospital in Sliven. A thirteenth victim, a 42-year-old man from Elhovo, succumbed to his injuries in a hospital in Burgas on 14 November.

The collisions injured 51 people, of whom 36 were admitted to hospitals in Sliven, 11 in Yambol, and the remaining 7 in Burgas. Among the injured was a Romanian citizen.

There were no children among either the fatalities or the injured.

== Aftermath ==
Traffic in the direction of Sofia was restored at 01:20 on 11 November, after the roadway had been cleared and washed down. Two hours later, traffic was also restored in the opposite lanes, heading toward Burgas.

A 62-year-old Romanian truck driver was released shortly after being arrested.

== Reactions ==
Prime Minister of Romania Luca Niculescu expressed condolences to the families of the victims.

== See also ==
- 2021 Bulgaria bus crash
