= St George's School, Harpenden =

Location
- Sun Lane; Harpenden, Hertfordshire, AL5 4TD; England; 51.82233°N 0.35367°W

Information
- Type: Academy; Day and boarding school
- Motto: Latin: Levavi Oculos (Aim Higher)
- Religious affiliation: Christian (Non-Denominational)
- Established: 1907
- Founder: Cecil Grant
- Department for Education URN: 138356 Tables
- Ofsted: Reports
- Headteacher: Andy Ford
- Religious Head: Rev Stephen Warner
- Gender: Coeducational
- Age: 11 to 18
- Enrolment: 1,375
- Houses: Goddard; Grant; Watts; Monk
- Colours: Red, Green,
- Alumni: Old Georgians
- Boarding fees: £5,575 per term (Years 7—13; from September 2024 onwards)
- Website: http://www.stgeorges.herts.sch.uk/

St George's School, Harpenden (also known as St George's), is a non-selective state day and boarding school in Harpenden, Hertfordshire, England, educating students of both sexes between the ages of eleven and eighteen, with an emphasis on its Christian ethos. It was founded in 1907 as one of Britain's first mixed-sex boarding schools. The school has International School status. The School was named as The Sunday Times 'Comprehensive School of the Year' in 2019. Its Ofsted rating as of 2025 is outstanding in all categories In 2022, the School was ranked as the 122nd best secondary state school in the country based on combined GCSE attainment and A-Level point scores.

== History ==
The school was founded in 1907 by Reverend Cecil Grant, having relocated his school southwards from Keswick, Cumbria in the Lake District to the site of the previous school.

In 1898 Grant, who was interested in co-education, was appointed the first headmaster of the newly reopened Keswick School. Along with Bedales School the school was the first co-educational day/boarding school in England. After a number of years, difficulties with the local authority and lack of a chapel prompted a move. The Harpenden site was discovered by one of the masters, a new limited company was formed and Grant together with 59 boys and girls and many of the staff moved there. The new school where pupils could live in an atmosphere closely related to family life, based on sound Christian principles was officially opened on 21 June 1907.

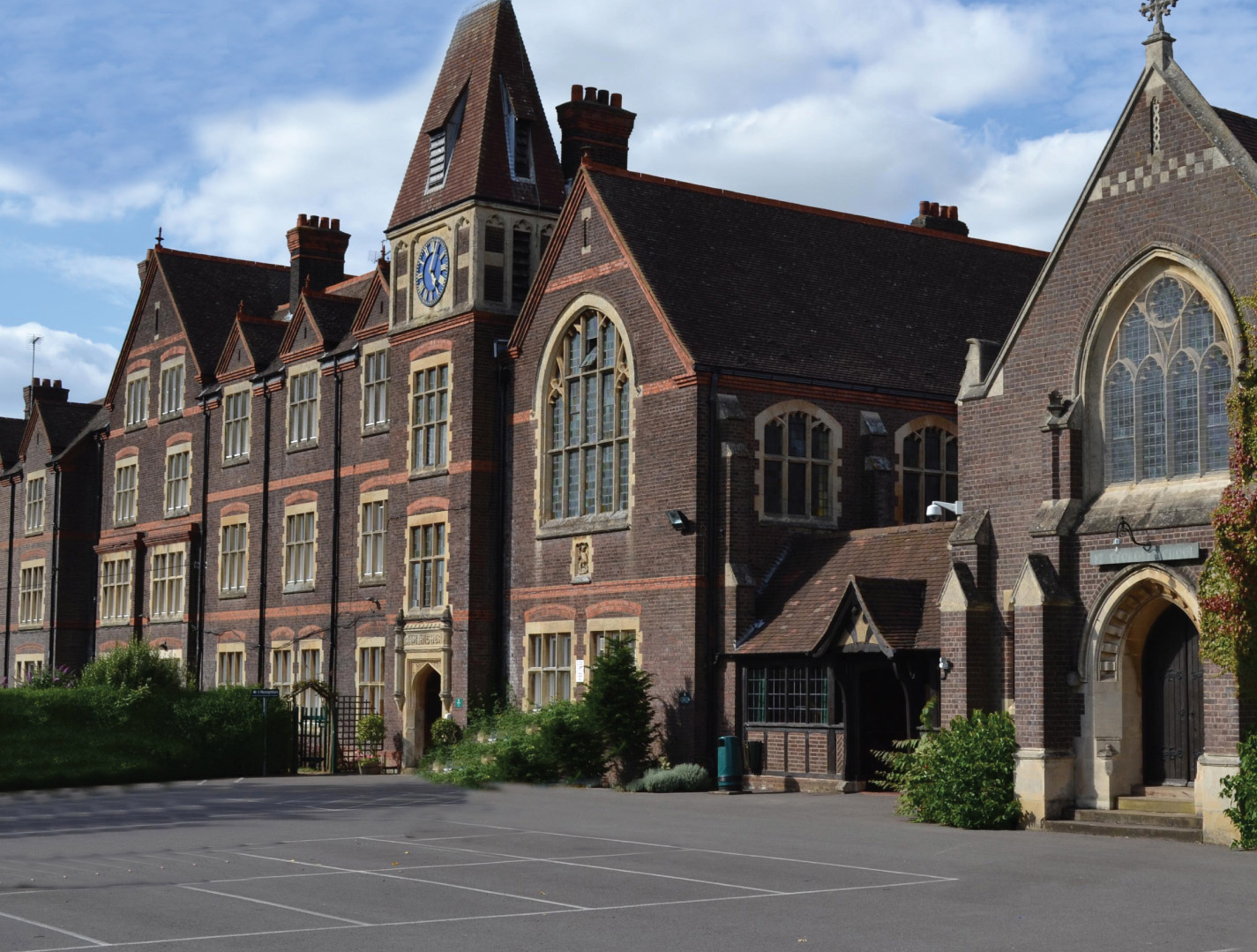
Aim higher entrance with clock tower above. Old Library and the chapel on the right. Girls boarding house to the left of clock tower

The Harpenden site had previously been home to a boarding school for 100 boys founded by Rev. Wix in 1887. A chapel was added in 1891 and a swimming pool in 1894. The school experienced a drop in numbers, with several masters and pupils leaving, and closed in 1904. The site was briefly leased to a branch of the United Services College.

In 1916 Grant founded a separate Montessori unit for pupils from 2 to 8 years of age. The initial location is unclear, but in 1924 moved to Kingston Lodge, adjacent to the school grounds. (Kingston Lodge later became Goddard House is now the music school.) In 1932 the school was renamed to St George's Children's House to attract larger numbers. Its business interests were formally merged with the main school from 1949. In 1955 it broke ties with St George's and moved to Gorselands near Harpenden common.

Grant retired in 1936 and A. H. Watts took over as headmaster, leading the school through the war years. Houses of the school were named after both men as well as Monk and Goddard, old Georgians who had died in the First World War. Names of the boarding houses: Crosthwaite, Keswick and Skiddaw come from locations near the Cumbrian school.

The Cinema Museum in London holds film of the school, its sports day, processions and activities from 1949.

In 1967 the school became under the control of Hertfordshire County Council, initially as a Grammar School and then as a Voluntary Aided School in the mid-1970s. This period saw a large expansion of the school with many new buildings and numbers expanding to 800. On 1 July 2012 St George's became an academy, funded by the new St George's School Harpenden Academy Trust. It continues to be supported by the Cecil Grant Founder's Trust, a charity set up after Grant's death in 1946.

The St. George's motto Levavi Oculos (Aim Higher) appears on the uniform badges. It derives from their School Hymn, Assurgit, which is sung in Latin. Levavi Oculos means "I have lifted up mine eyes" and alludes to Psalm 121, beginning "I will lift up mine eyes unto the hills, from whence cometh my help; my help cometh even from the Lord, who hath made Heaven and Earth." In the sense of "I have raised my sights" this is equivalent to the English motto Aim Higher, which appears over one archway at the front entrance of Keswick House.

== Christian ethos ==
Admission to the school for day students is based mainly on location of students' homes, with students coming from many of the surrounding towns and villages. Regular attendance at a local church is required; however, the school itself is non-denominational and does not receive funding from any religious group or church.

The school is centred on a late-nineteenth-century chapel, which is led by a resident chaplain and supported by a part-time organist.

== House System ==
In 1972, the House System is introduced in St Georges School. The houses are named after several old students and headteachers.

- Goddard - Red, named after Lister Goddard, who is an old pupil, and died in WW1
- Grant - Green, named after Cecil Grant who founded the school.
- Monk - Blue, named after Bertram Monk who fought in WW2 and died while attempting to capture a machine gun.
- Watts - Yellow, named after Dr Watts who was a priest and the second headmaster of the school.

== Academics ==
In 2019 St George's was ranked third in examination results in the country for state schools and rivals some of the private schools. Its academic Sixth Form has the third highest progress score in the county, beating almost all local Independent Schools (Including St Alban's School and Haberdashers' Aske's Boys' School).

In 2014 it received an Outstanding Ofsted rating. It has a Progress 8 measure of 0.95 which is well above average.

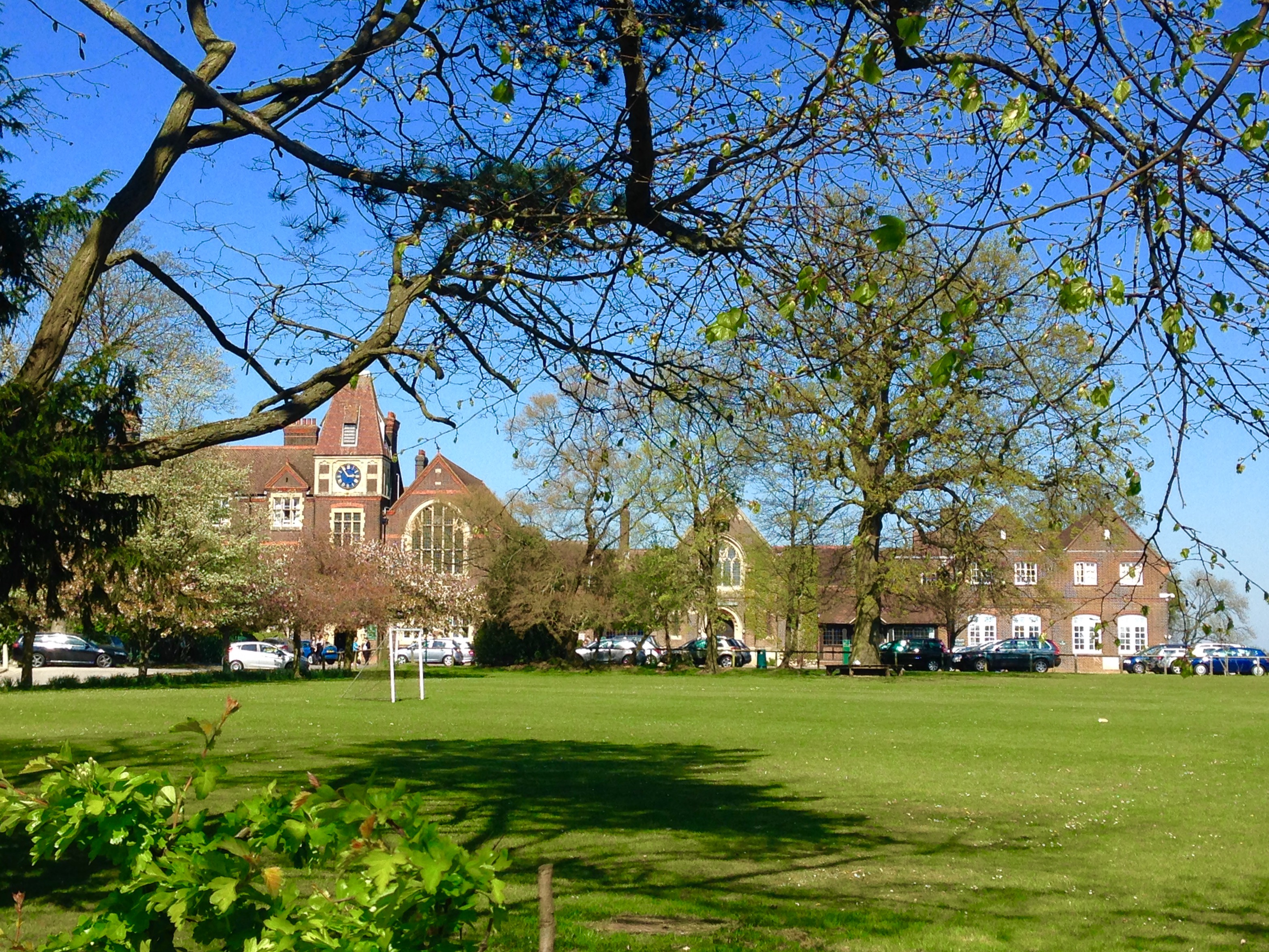
St George's School Harpenden

In 2025, it received another outstanding Ofsted rating.

== Extra-curricular activities ==
The school music department (via on-site tuition company Musicale) offer peripatetic instrumental tuition for all woodwind, string and brass instruments as well as classical and jazz piano, guitar, drums and voice. Regular concerts take place in the chapel and the old library. During the autumn term each year, the Music Department collaborate with the Drama and Performing Arts Department to produce a whole school production. The Drama Department also host an 'Inter-House Drama Festival', which is adjudicated by a professional actor, and a lower-school drama production.

In 1939 St George's School won the first National Schools Sevens tournament and has continued this Rugby success producing Rugby Sevens and Rugby Union internationals. The Rugby teams continue this legacy today producing many England Under-18 and Under-16 Rugby Players.

The school is notable for having first fielded the English national players Owen Farrell and Maro Itoje, alongside two other members of England's rugby union team (as of 2019).

In 1948 D Usherwood became the 14th recorded cricketer to take all 10 wickets for 0 runs (10–0) at any level of the game worldwide, playing for the U12s team.

Until September 2019, house points cumulated via means of various events would form an overall tally and the winning house be awarded the Chapman Cup.

The Chapman Cup has since been renamed the Endeavour Cup.

The school offers many lunchtime and after-school clubs such as Warhammer .

== Boarding ==
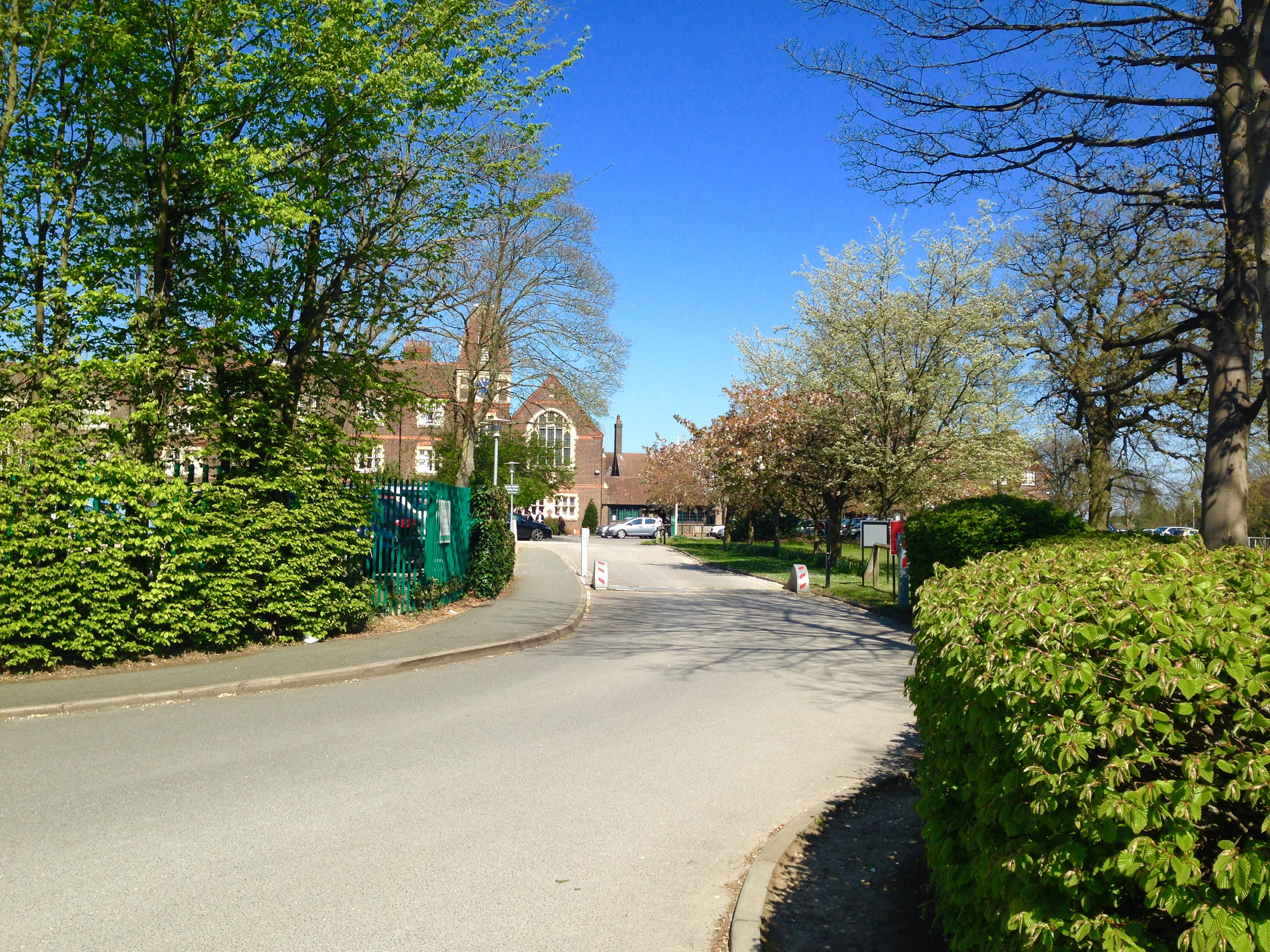
Aim Higher entrance on Carlton Road leading to girls boarding house

Keswick and Crosthwaite House provide boarding accommodation for girl and boy boarders respectively.

St George's was one of the first schools in Britain to provide mixed-sex boarding education.

Skiddaw house provides boarding services for those of either sex in sixth form.

== Notable alumni ==
Distinguished alumni of the school, known as 'Old Georgians', include:

Name	Description
Sir Christopher Ball	Academic. Warden of Keble College, Oxford, from 1980 to 1988. The first chancellor of the University of Derby.
Sacha Bennett	Actor, writer, producer and director for film and television.
Lennox Berkeley	British composer of French influence, moving towards serialism in later life.
Donald Coxeter	One of the great geometers of the 20th century.
Sir Maurice Drake DFC	High Court Judge of England and Wales, in charge of the jury list from 1991 to retirement in 1995. Appointed Treasurer of Lincoln's Inn in 1997. Officer in the RAF and awarded the Distinguished Flying Cross during World War II.
Peter Dyke	English cathedral organist
Hilary Evans	British pictorial archivist, author, and researcher into UFOs and other paranormal phenomena
Owen Farrell	Rugby Union player for Saracens and England - Triple Crown, Calcutta Cup, Six Nations, Grand Slam Winner 2016 and 2019 Rugby World Cup runner-up.
George Ford	Rugby Union player for Leicester Tigers and England - Triple Crown, Calcutta Cup, Six Nations, Grand Slam (rugby union) Winner 2016 and 2019 Rugby World Cup runner up.
Phoebe Gill	Olympic 800m runner for Team GB
Victor Goddard	Air Marshall. A senior commander in the Royal Air Force during World War II.
Laura Haddock	Actress – played Alison in The Inbetweeners Movie, Meredith Quill in the Guardians of the Galaxy (film) series, and Lucrezia Donati in Da Vinci's Demons.
Patrick Heron	English abstract artist with work currently hanging in the Tate Gallery, St Ives.
George Hogg	British journalist who rescued 60 Chinese orphans during the Japanese occupation, as portrayed in the 2008 film The Children of Huang Shi. A biography Blades of Grass – The Story of George Aylwin Hogg was published in January 2017
Francis Hollis	Bishop of Labuan and Sarawak from 1938 to 1948.
Francis House	Archdeacon of Macclesfield from 1967 to 1978
Kenneth Horne	Comedian.
Andrew Hunter	Member of Parliament, 1983–2005.
Maro Itoje	England and Saracens, Rugby Union player- Debuted for England 14/2/16, Six Nations - (vs Italy). Triple Crown, Calcutta Cup, Six Nations and Grand Slam Winner 2016 and 2019 Rugby World Cup runner-up.
Wanda Jablonski	Leading journalist of the oil industry from 1948 to 1988.
Paul Liebrandt	American Celebrity Chef
Frances Lincoln	Publisher and founder of Frances Lincoln Publishers.
Edward Martell (politician)	Politician and Libertarian activist.
Laura Merrifield	Captain of the England Women's Lacrosse Team, Player for All-World Team 2013 and 2017
Varoon Nesarasa	One of The Puppini Sisters.
Frederick Moore	Cricketer for Cambridge University and Schoolmaster.
Athol Murray	First-class cricketer for Warwickshire.
Michael Oakeshott	English philosopher with particular interests in political thought.
Anna Patten	Premiership footballer for Aston Villa and the Republic of Ireland
Peter Alan Rayner	British coin-book author having written English Silver Coinage 1649 to date.
Jack Singleton	England and Saracens, Rugby Union player- Debuted for England 11/8/19 (vs Wales), at Twickenham, appeared as a substitute in the 2019 Rugby World Cup vs United States
Dr Denis Wright	Composer and conductor of brass band music.
