= 2019 Totnes bus crash =

Bus crash in Devon, England

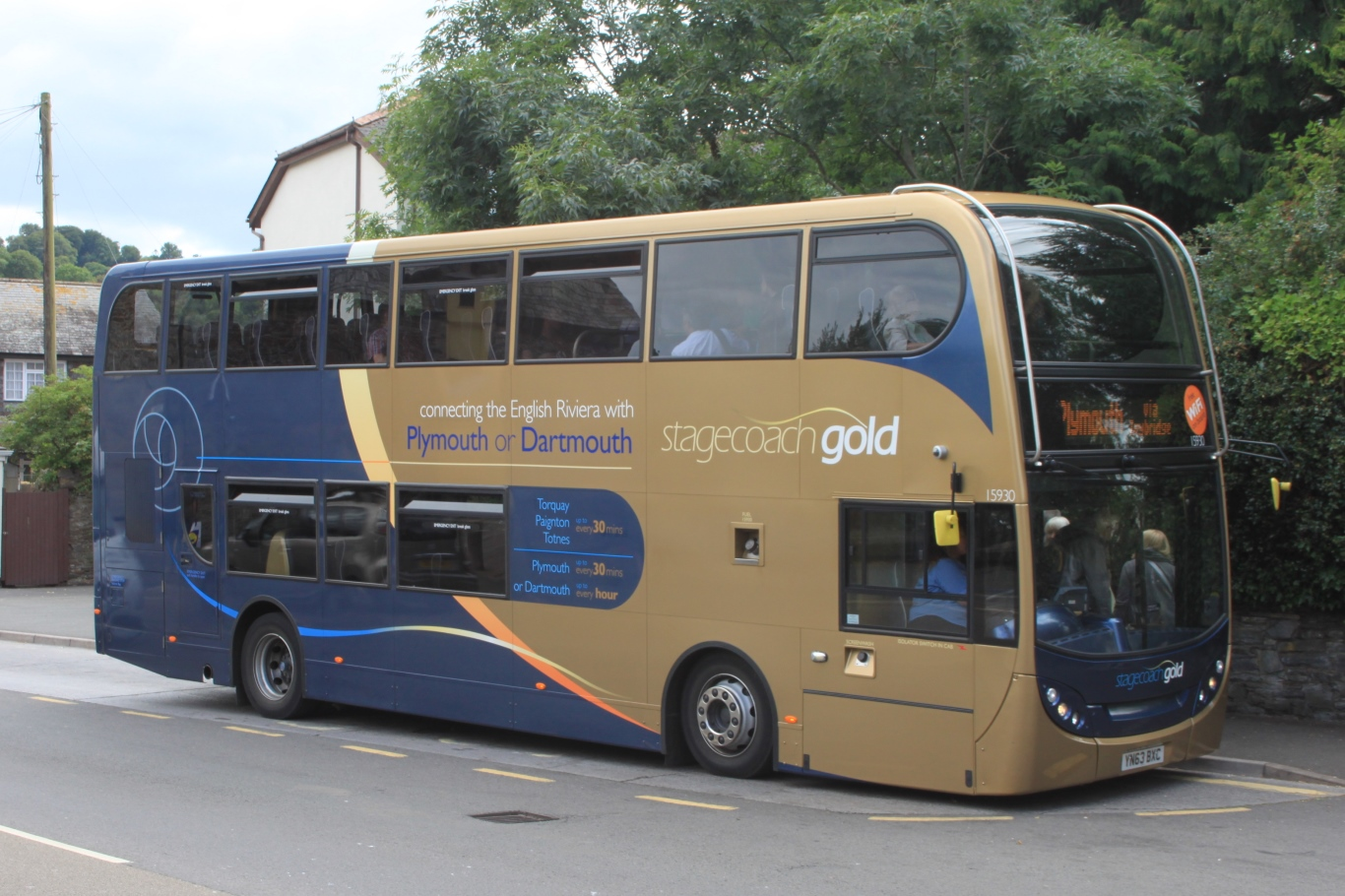
- A Scania N230UD double-decker bus operating for Stagecoach Gold, similar to the one involved in the incident.

Details
- Date: 5 October 2019
- Location: A385 road, near Totnes, Devon
- Coordinates: 50.4332°N 3.6315°W
- Operator: Stagecoach South West

Statistics
- Bus: Scania N230UD
- Vehicles: 1
- Deaths: 0
- Injured: 50+ total 37 hospitalised 8 serious

The 2019 Totnes bus crash was a single-vehicle collision on the A385 road at Berry Pomeroy, Devon, England on 5 October 2019. More than 50 people – including the driver – were injured when a double-decker bus overturned at high speed between Totnes and Paignton. Eight passengers suffered injuries described as "serious" out of 37 requiring hospitalisation; though there were no fatalities.

The bus, a 2013 Alexander Dennis Enviro400 bodied Scania N230UD double-decker operated by Stagecoach South West on Stagecoach Gold services, was operating a scheduled passenger service from Torquay to Plymouth when the driver lost control of the vehicle at a sharp bend on the rural A385 single-carriageway road. The bus mounted the unpaved verge on the outside of the bend, crashed through roadside hedgerows and subsequently came to rest on its side in an adjacent grass field.

On 12 July 2021, the driver of the bus, 19-year-old Kameron Allan, was convicted of driving without due care and attention; he received a twelve-month driving ban and a fine. Allan was cleared of the more serious initial charge of causing serious injury by dangerous driving. Additionally, Stagecoach South West were criticised for allowing Allan to drive the bus given his lack of experience with the vehicle and the route.

== Incident ==
At the time of the incident, the bus was operating on the Stagecoach Gold service from Torquay to Plymouth, and it had just departed the town of Paignton with a full and standing load of passengers. Between there and the next major settlement, Totnes, the Gold route uses the rural A385 single-carriageway road. The speed limit on this section of road is 60 mph (97 km/h). The crash occurred at 10:50 local time, close to the village of Berry Pomeroy.

Travelling westbound along the A385, the bus driver, 19-year-old Kameron Allan, became distracted for around 18 seconds by his jacket flapping from the opened cab window of the bus. While Allan was distracted by attempts to retrieve these items, the bus left the road at a sharp right-hand bend in an area of open country. After mounting the grass verge and crashing through a hedgerow along the outside of the bend, the bus fell 5 ft (1.5 m) down an embankment, coming to rest on its side in a grassy field close to the road. According to an eyewitness on board, the entire incident panned out during the space of only around five seconds, which started with the bus beginning to shake and several passengers screaming; there was then a change in momentum as the bus fell over onto the passenger side. Several passengers had to climb over unconscious bodies to escape from the wreckage.

=== Emergency response ===
Following the crash, Devon and Cornwall Police declared a major incident. Thirteen ambulances attended the scene by road, and four air ambulance helicopters were dispatched to the incident site to attend to the most severely injured passengers. More than 140 emergency services personnel attended the scene at the peak of the major incident, including firefighters who cut into the roof of the overturned bus to rescue passengers trapped inside the top deck. Out of the more than fifty people injured in the crash (including the bus driver), 37 people were taken to five different hospitals throughout Devon. Eight people suffered serious injuries and had to be stretchered out of the top deck through holes cut into the roof; there were no fatalities. The accident occurred on a Saturday, and at several hospitals operated by the Torbay and South Devon NHS Foundation Trust, dozens of staff members were called in to work on their days off as a result of the major incident declaration. Accident and emergency departments at local hospitals were stretched to capacity, and the public were urged not to attend hospitals unless there was a real emergency.

=== Aftermath ===
Uninjured passengers were taken to Paignton bus station by road to continue their journeys or receive further support. A spokesperson for bus company Stagecoach South West confirmed that they were assisting the emergency services with their inquiries and that their thoughts were with the victims of the crash. Sarah Wollaston, the Liberal Democrat Member of Parliament for Totnes, tweeted her thanks to the emergency services for their response to the incident.

The A385 road remained closed between Totnes and Paignton until 18:00 on the day of the crash to allow for emergency road repairs and an initial crime scene investigation to take place. The road was then closed again the following day for the vehicle recovery operation, during which the bus was righted using a roadside crane, winched onto the road and towed back to its home depot in Torquay for storage.

== Subsequent developments ==
=== Charges and court case ===
The Driver and Vehicle Standards Agency (DVSA) launched an investigation into the bus crash alongside Devon and Cornwall Police. The driver of the bus, 19-year-old Kameron Allan, was subsequently charged with ten counts of causing serious injury by dangerous driving. A representative for the transport union RMT alleged that Allan had only passed his Passenger Carrying Vehicle (PCV) driving test three months prior to the crash, and that the journey during which the incident occurred was the first time he had driven this Stagecoach Gold service, raising questions of driver training and route familiarity at Stagecoach South West.

The trial was delayed several times due to the COVID-19 pandemic in the United Kingdom, during which Allan was released on unconditional bail. At a preliminary hearing at Newton Abbot Magistrates Court on 16 September 2020, Allan pleaded not guilty to all ten charges. The case was subsequently sent to Plymouth Crown Court. A second preliminary hearing took place at the crown court on 19 October 2020, during which Allan again pleaded not guilty to all charges. A further preliminary hearing took place on 13 May 2021, with the final trial initially scheduled to take place on 1 June 2021. On 29 May, the trial was delayed until 12 July.

The trial at Plymouth Crown Court commenced on 12 July 2021. Allan admitted to losing control of the vehicle while dealing with the distraction of attempting to retrieve his jacket, which was flapping from the opened cab window of the bus. Allan told police in his first interview after the accident that he had worked for Stagecoach South West since September 2016, mainly as a mechanic and commercial officer. Allan was never employed by Stagecoach as a bus driver, although he did occasionally drive buses as a hobby. Stagecoach were subsequently criticised for allowing Allan to drive the bus with so little prior experience of both the vehicle type and the route.

On the first day of the trial, Allan pleaded guilty to the lesser charge of a single count of driving without due care and attention. The court dropped the initial charge of ten counts of causing serious injury by dangerous driving, handing Allan a twelve-month driving ban and a £250 fine.

=== Bus company response ===
In November 2019, bus company Stagecoach South West denied that the long-term absence of two senior members of staff was related to the ongoing criminal investigation into the bus crash at Totnes. Later however, seven weeks after the crash, the company confirmed the departure of their managing director after 20 years in the role in order to find "new challenges" elsewhere.

=== Road safety improvements ===
In August 2020, following an internal investigation, Devon County Council installed reflective plastic bollards along the outside of the bend at which the bus crash occurred, which at the time had been an unprotected soft grass verge. Local residents and the transport union RMT criticised the safety measures, suggesting that they did not go far enough and that further accidents at the site were inevitable. The council defended the bollard installation, stating that they adequately highlighted a gap in the hedgerow which had not yet regrown following the bus crash as well as the steep drop down into the adjacent field.

== See also ==
- M40 minibus crash (1993)
- 2004 Ingoldmells bus crash
- 2010 Keswick coach accident
