= 1997 crash =

1997 crash can refer to:

- 1997 M42 motorway crash
- FedEx Express Flight 14
- October 27, 1997, mini-crash

== See also ==
- Category:Transport disasters in 1997
- 1997 Asian financial crisis
