= 1991 M4 motorway crash =

Multi-vehicle collision in Berkshire, England

Coordinates: 51.4696°N 1.5209°W

1991 M4 crash
- Location: M4 between junctions 14 and 15, near Lambourn, Berkshire
- Deaths: 10
- Injuries: 25
- Property damage: 51 vehicles destroyed or damaged; road surface scorched; central reservation damaged
- Location in Berkshire and England

On 13 March 1991, a multiple-vehicle collision occurred during foggy conditions on the eastbound carriageway of the M4 motorway near Hungerford, Berkshire, between the Membury service station and junction 14.

Ten people were killed in the pile-up, which involved 51 vehicles, making it one of the deadliest crashes in the history of Britain's motorway network.

== Circumstances ==
A van driver claimed something flew up in front of him, believed to be jackdaws, startling him and causing him to skid into the central reservation, but it was later reported that he fell asleep at the wheel. A car travelling behind the van changed lanes to avoid contact, but other vehicles behind, which were travelling at speeds averaging 70 miles per hour, failed to avoid the crashed van and skidded into the other lanes of the carriageway. Others took evasive action by driving onto the hard shoulder and up the sides of the cutting. An articulated lorry then jack-knifed across all three lanes of the eastbound carriageway.

One driver – Alan Bateman – freed himself from his car and ran back down the central reservation to warn approaching motorists, but was ignored or hooted by some drivers as they continued towards the crash. In a period of 19 seconds, 51 vehicles became involved in a pile-up. Car fuel exploded along with the highly combustible material being carried in one of the vans (possibly deodorant) and the resultant series of explosions closed the carriageway for four days as the charred wrecks were removed and the road surface replaced.

Ten people were killed and 25 others were injured, making it one of the worst pile-ups on a motorway in Britain. There were three minor collisions caused by distracted drivers on the opposite carriageway of the motorway. It was noted at the time that there were "nearly as many" people killed and injured in the crash than in the British Army from enemy fire in the Gulf War.

In parliament, MP Michael McNair-Wilson asked why the Thames Valley and Wiltshire police forces had not activated the motorway hazard lights to warn drivers of the patchy fog, but the under-secretary for transport, Christopher Chope, stated that these signs were only used for hazards not readily apparent to drivers and not for adverse weather conditions. The crash led to warning signals being introduced on British motorways to warn drivers of fog.

== Tribute ==
The accident took place at the time of year when daffodils bloom in Southern England. After the accident, some police officers who attended the scene planted daffodil bulbs in the bank on the side of the road next to the accident. For many years in the middle of March, the site was marked by a patch of yellow.

== See also ==
- 1993 M40 minibus crash
- 1997 M42 motorway crash
- 2011 M5 motorway crash
- 2017 M1 motorway crash
