= Maurice Drake =

British judge (1923–2014)

Sir Maurice Drake DFC
- Royal coat of arms of the United Kingdom

High Court Judge
- In office 1978–1995
- Monarch: Elizabeth II

Personal details
- Born: 15 February 1923
- Died: 6 April 2014 (Aged 91) Harpenden, United Kingdom
- Children: 5
- Education: St George's School, Harpenden
- Alma mater: Exeter College, Oxford
- Occupation: Judge
- Profession: Barrister

Sir Frederick Maurice Drake, DFC (15 February 1923 – 6 April 2014) was a judge of the High Court of England and Wales who presided over several high-profile defamation cases in the 1990s including: Taylforth v News Group (1994) and Donovan v The Face (1993).

== Early life ==
Drake was the son of a wool merchant and was educated at St George's School, Harpenden, Hertfordshire, before service in the Royal Air Force (RAF) during the Second World War as a navigator, initially with 96 Squadron but soon after with 255 Squadron. Whilst with 255, Drake flew night patrols in Bristol Beaufighter aircraft over Africa and Italy and was awarded the Distinguished Flying Cross following a number of successes against enemy aircraft.

== Career ==
Following the end of the war, Drake completed studies at Exeter College, Oxford in jurisprudence. He was called to the Bar at Lincoln's Inn in 1950, joining 4 Paper Buildings (later Hailsham Chambers), in Inner Temple. Drake later took silk. He was appointed a High Court Judge of the Queen’s Bench Division in 1978 where one of his first cases was the murder of Carl Bridgewater. The conviction was overturned in 1997.

As a High Court judge, Drake presided over several high-profile defamation cases in the 1990s including: Donovan v The Face (1993) and Taylforth v News Group (1994). In Gordon Angelsea v Observer, he admitted he had been a Freemason since the 1940s. In 1993, he granted an injunction to Princess Diana to prevent the publication of photographs taken without her consent whilst she was exercising.

In 1991, Drake succeeded Sir Michael Davies as the judge in charge of the jury list. Following retirement in 1995, he continued to hear occasional cases. In 1996, he agreed to stand aside from a trial because he was a Freemason. He served as Treasurer of Lincoln's Inn in 1997. He also served as the mayor of St Albans.

Coat of arms of Maurice Drake

Motto
Levavi Oculos Ad Auroram
