= Cecil Grant =

Founder of St. George's School, Harpenden

The Reverend Cecil Grant

Founding Headmaster of St George's School, Harpenden
- In office 1 September 1907 – 1 August 1936
- Preceded by: Position established
- Succeeded by: Dr. A. H. Watts

Headmaster of Keswick School
- In office 1 September 1898 – 1 August 1907
- Preceded by: Position established
- Succeeded by: Unknown

Personal details
- Born: Cecil Grant; 1870
- Died: 1946 (76 Years)

Cecil Grant (1870–1946) was an English cleric and schoolmaster, an advocate of co-education. He was the founder of St George's School, Harpenden.

== Early life ==
He was born on 18 August 1870 at Linton, Kent, the fifth son of John Grant, and was educated at Sutton Valence School. He matriculated at Wadham College, Oxford in 1889, graduating B.A. in 1893 with a third class in Greats, and M.A. in 1896.

Grant was ordained deacon in the Church of England in 1894, and priest in 1896, by Edward Bickersteth, Bishop of Exeter. He was chaplain and assistant master at Honiton Grammar School from 1893 to 1898.

== Headmaster at Keswick ==
From 1898 to 1906 Grant was at Keswick. Money for High Schools in Keswick had been left in the will of Henry Hewetson (died 1895). In line with a talk he had given at the 1903 North of England Education Conference, the Rev. Hardwicke Rawnsley, who became chairman of the governors, supported the idea of a single co-educational school. A building was designed by architects Paley & Austin. There were 116 applicants for the post of headmaster of the new Keswick High School. From Queen Mary's Grammar School in Walsall, where he was Second Master, Cecil was appointed in early 1898.

== Headmaster at Harpenden ==
In 1906 Grant moved to Harpenden to establish a school there; it opened in 1907. The United Services College initially occupied the premises, having taken over St George's School, where Robert Henry Wix was headmaster from 1887 to 1904.

Grant was headmaster of the new St George's School from 1907 to 1936. Hardwicke Rawnsley became Chairman of the Governors there.

James Valentine (1879/80–1920), son of George Valentine, taught at Keswick Grammar School, then St George's School, Harpenden, before becoming headmaster of Harwich County School in 1909, dying in that post. He was a graduate of the University of St Andrews who had acted as assistant to John Burnet. The Suffolk school authorities cited his scholarship, experience with co-education, and enthusiasm.

Other staff at St George's, Harpenden included Paul Roberts, later headmaster of Frensham Heights School, and J. Howard Whitehouse, founder in 1919 of Bembridge School.

== Aspects of progressive education ==
In 1913, at the prompting of Edmond Holmes, Cecil visited Maria Montessori's school, the Casa dei Bambini in Rome. He became a proponent of Montessori education, but found that it was contentious in the United Kingdom, with Charlotte Mason, whose House of Education at Ambleside he had intended to visit, strongly opposed.

== Death ==
Cecil Grant died on 3 April 1946 and left £6,833.53 to form a trust for the school.

== Family ==
Grant married in 1898 Lucy Mary Thompson, youngest daughter of William Thompson of Haslemere, Ipswich, founder of Thompson & Morgan. His father's address was given as Belmont Grove, Lee, Kent.

== Works ==
- A School's Life, Addresses (1903)
- The Case for Co-education (1913) with Norman Hodgson
- English Education and Dr. Montessori (1913)
