= Peter Alan Rayner =

British numismatist (1924–2007)

- Born: 8 December 1924; Harpenden, Hertfordshire
- Died: 29 July 2007 (aged 82)
- Other names: 'P. Alan Rayner'; Alan Rayner
- Occupations: Numismatist; Author

Peter Alan Rayner (8 December 1924 – 29 July 2007) was a British author of numismatic (coin collecting) books. He was known by his second name Alan, rather than his first, to avoid confusion with Peter Seaby, also a popular author, whose family firm Rayner joined at the age of 24.

== Biography ==
Rayner lived in Harpenden, Hertfordshire where he attended St George's School, Harpenden as a day boarder. During World War II he was conscripted into the mines as a Bevin Boy, although he was eventually released owing to ill health and enlisted in the Intelligence Corps.

In 1948 he joined B.A. Seaby Limited as an assistant in the English Coin Department, and began to specialise in milled silver coins. In early 1954 he wrote a small 26-page booklet entitled The Designers and Engravers of the English Milled Coinage 1662 - 1953. The book was published by Seaby's Numismatic Publications and covered each denomination showing the engravers and designers of both the obverse and reverse of each coin.

In 1957 he helped prepare for print a second revised edition of the book called English Silver Coinage from 1649, written by Herbert Allen Seaby and first published in 1949.

This proved to be one of the most popular books published by B.A. Seaby Limited and further updated editions were printed in 1967, 1974, 1992, 2015, 2020 and the most recent 7th edition in 2021 (republished by author Maurice Bull and printed by Spink and son). The book is used by numismatists as a main reference for all English silver coinage from 1649 to the year 1992 with a three-lettered prefixed (ESC - referring to English Silver Coinage) numbering system attributable to each coin and any variant. In 1961 Rayner wrote Your Book of Coin Collecting (published by Faber & Faber London). This presented to the new collector of coins 'a complete guide to Coin Collecting'. In 1966 he also wrote the book Coin Collecting For Amateurs published by Frederick Muller Ltd of Fleet Street.

Rayner remained at Seaby's until 1974, when he left to join the English branch of the coin company Paramount. He immediately became a valued member of staff whose knowledge of silver coins was unrivalled. He also specialised in foreign coins, in particular German.

== Personal life ==
He is survived by his Swiss wife Madeleine (from Schaffhausen who caused Rayner to learn Schweizerdeutsch - Swiss German), four children (Christopher, Peter, Hester and John) and eight grandchildren.
