= 1999 Ontario Highway 401 crash =

Major multi-vehicle collision

The September 3, 1999, Ontario Highway 401 crash, was a multiple-vehicle collision that resulted from dense fog conditions on a section of Ontario Highway 401 between Windsor and Tilbury. There were 87 vehicles involved in the pile-up in both directions of the divided highway, killing eight people and injuring a further 45.

The crash, which was the most infamous in a slew of fatal crashes on the highway between Windsor and Chatham during the 1990s, led to significant improvements to that section.

== Background ==
The section of Highway 401 between Windsor and London was constructed in stages in the 1950s and 1960s. It was an asphalt-paved highway carrying two lanes of traffic in each direction. Although parts of the highway had been constructed with several deliberate curves to reduce driver inattention, a 32-kilometre (20 mi) stretch west of Tilbury was built following straight concession lines to minimize damage to the surrounding agricultural areas. The two carriageways were separated by a grass median, which was particularly narrow between Windsor and Tilbury as that section was the first built in 1955. That section of the highway also had soft gravel shoulders as per the original design.

The straight road and flat, agricultural landscape were said to cause highway hypnosis and driver fatigue. The narrow grass median proved little obstacle in stopping vehicles from travelling into the opposing traffic carriageway, leading to several head-on collisions. The soft shoulders were also a factor in some crashes, where drivers who veered into the shoulder immediately over-corrected which often led to spin-outs and rollovers. Between Windsor and London, the Canadian Automobile Association (CAA) had dubbed a 40-mile stretch as "Carnage Alley"; four were killed in 1997 and three died in 1998. In 1999 from March to September, 15 people had been killed and over 60 injured in 10 crashes between Windsor and Chatham-Kent, with the upcoming September 3 pile-up raising the death toll to 22 by the end of the year.

Days before the crash in 1999, Ontario Minister of Transportation David Turnbull had travelled the portion of highway and called it "pleasant to drive".

== Pile-up on September 3 ==
The 87-vehicle pile up on September 3, 1999

On the morning of Friday, September 3, 1999, a malfunction at the Windsor Airport Observation Station failed to detect foggy conditions, and no fog warnings were issued. The malfunction was not discovered until later. Around 8:00 am near the Manning Road overpass, a tractor-trailer entered a very dense fog patch and slowed suddenly, causing a following tractor-trailer to jack-knife. Reports indicated that the fog reduced visibility to less than 1 metre (3.3 ft). The initial crash set off a chain reaction of five further separate collisions, as other drivers unable to see the obstruction continued into the dense fog, colliding with crashed vehicles for several minutes. 87 vehicles were involved, many burnt and destroyed. Many people were injured in their vehicles or struck as they attempted to flee the pile-up. Seven people died at the scene and one more died later in hospital; 45 people were injured. The September 3 pile-up occurred 16 kilometers west of the stretch that the CAA had labelled as "Carnage Alley". There were collisions in both directions at that segment of Highway 401, although no vehicles crossed the highway's median.

Sgt. B.G. Mailloux of the Ontario Provincial Police described the pile-up as "a massive fireball". Emergency services reported charred bodies inside vehicles, while several of the vehicles were unrecognizable and had to be traced by their registration numbers. In an area dubbed the "hot zone" or "fiery centre", several vehicles were fused together. Traffic was temporarily rerouted on Highway 2 to the north and Highway 3 to the south, while Highway 401 had to be repaved before reopening to traffic.

== Safety improvements ==
Immediately following the crash, the Ministry of Transportation (MTO) installed paved shoulders with rumble strips and funded additional police to patrol the highway, a move criticized as being insufficient.

The Canadian Automobile Association's (CAA) manager of public and government affairs, Nick Ferris, noted that while the September 3 crash was about 16 kilometers west of the "Carnage Alley" notorious stretch, he stated that "The conditions are similar. It just widened the kill zone". The CAA hired traffic experts to study the section, whose findings called for the replacement of the grass median with an additional traffic lane per direction (for three lanes in each direction) separated by a concrete median barrier. While the six-laning upgrade was part of the MTO's long-term plan for the entire highway and had been implemented for the London-Woodstock and Guelph-Milton sections in the early 1990s, at the time of the pile-up there was not sufficient funding nor traffic volumes for the Windsor-London section.

A coroner's inquest into the crash led to 25 recommendations for safety improvements to the highway. These included increasing traffic enforcement and reintroducing photo radar, as well as a review of safety standards for highway construction based on current data.

Public outrage from the crash led Turnbull to announce a plan for safer roads, including improvements to the stretch of highway west of London. In 2004, a $322 million plan of road improvements began east of Windsor, which included fully paved shoulders and a concrete median barrier, both with rumble strips, and reflective markers in curved sections. Construction on the improvements in Carnage Alley was completed between Windsor and Tilbury in 2010.

In 2009 the MTO conducted an environmental assessment to widen the stretch of Highway 401 between Tilbury and London to six lanes, but as of 2016 no significant highway improvements had been made, due to its rural nature and long distance as well as lack of traffic. However, the narrow grass median remained prone to crossover collisions, especially in bad weather. In 2017, Chatham-Kent Conservative MPP Rick Nicholls questioned if "drivers might be avoiding Carnage Alley precisely because it is so dangerous?"

On August 29, 2017, a mother and daughter were killed in another cross-over collision on the unmodified stretch of the highway near Dutton, which drew renewed public outrage. Shortly afterwards the government announced plans to install a high-tension cable barrier in the grass median from Tilbury to Ridgetown. Advocates viewed the government's response as inadequate, and delivered a petition signed by 3,000 residents to Queen's Park demanding construction of a concrete barrier from Tilbury to London.

In early 2018 the MTO committed to installing a concrete barrier on the stretch from Tilbury to London, with plans to install high-tension cables in the grass median as a short-term solution. The concrete barrier was completed from Tilbury to Merlin Road in Chatham-Kent in 2023. Plans to continue the barrier from Merlin Road to London were under engineering study as of 2024, coupled with plans to expand Highway 401 there.
