= Frederick Moore (Cambridge University cricketer) =

English schoolmaster and cricketer

Personal information
- Full name: Frederic James Stevenson Moore
- Born: 26 February 1873; Leominster, Herefordshire, England
- Died: 1 March 1947 (aged 74); Sherborne, Dorset, England
- Batting: Right-handed
- Bowling: Slow left-arm orthodox

Domestic team information
- Years: Team
- 1896: Cambridge University
- 1902: Dorset

Career statistics
Competition	First-class
Matches	1
Runs scored	61
Batting average	61.00
100s/50s	–/1
Top score	61
Catches/stumpings	2/–
- Source: Cricinfo, 16 June 2022

Frederick James Stevenson Moore (26 February 1873 – 1 March 1947) was an English schoolmaster and a cricketer who played first-class cricket for Cambridge University Cricket Club in 1896. He was born at Leominster, Herefordshire and died at Sherborne, Dorset. In some records, including cricket databases, his first name is spelled "Frederic"; in others, including censuses, it has a final "k".

Moore was educated at St George's School, Harpenden (the forerunner to the current school of that name) and at St John's College, Cambridge. Academically gifted, he took a first-class degree in Part I of the Cambridge University Classical Tripos, and graduated with a Bachelor of Arts degree in 1895. His single game of first-class cricket came after he had technically left the university: he appeared as a middle-order batsman in the match against Yorkshire in 1896 and scored 61 runs in his only innings. The report of the match in The Times bracketed Moore's name in terms of success with those of three other Cambridge batsmen, Cuthbert Burnup, Frank Druce and Gilbert Jessop, all of whom went on to play Test cricket. Moore's subsequent cricket was less illustrious: he played minor matches for Herefordshire (not then a Minor Counties team) and one Minor Counties Championship game in 1902 for Dorset.

Moore became a schoolmaster after leaving Cambridge. He was an assistant master at Mill Hill School in 1899, and then moved the following year to Sherborne School where he remained until he retired in 1933.
