= Athol Murray (cricketer) =

English cricketer

Athol Leslie Murray (29 June 1901 – 10 January 1981) was an English cricketer who played first-class cricket in 11 matches for Warwickshire in 1922. He was born at Mill Hill in north London and died at Grasmere in Cumbria.

Murray was educated at St George's School, Harpenden, and Wadham College, Oxford; while at Oxford, he played in trial matches for the university cricket team but was not selected for any first-class matches. When the Oxford summer term was over in 1922, he started playing for Warwickshire as a right-handed middle-order batsman and scored 33 in his first innings in the game against Surrey. He was not, however, able to better this score, although he equalled it in a match against Hampshire in which he also took, with his right-arm medium-pace bowling, the only two first-class wickets of his career, albeit when Hampshire's total was nearing 500 and as the ninth bowler tried. In 17 innings in 1922 for Warwickshire, he scored only 161 runs and he did not play first-class cricket again.

Murray had more success at Oxford as a golfer and won a Blue in both 1922 and 1923 by playing in the golf match against Cambridge University.
