= Mirambeau, Charente-Maritime =

Mirambeau
- Commune
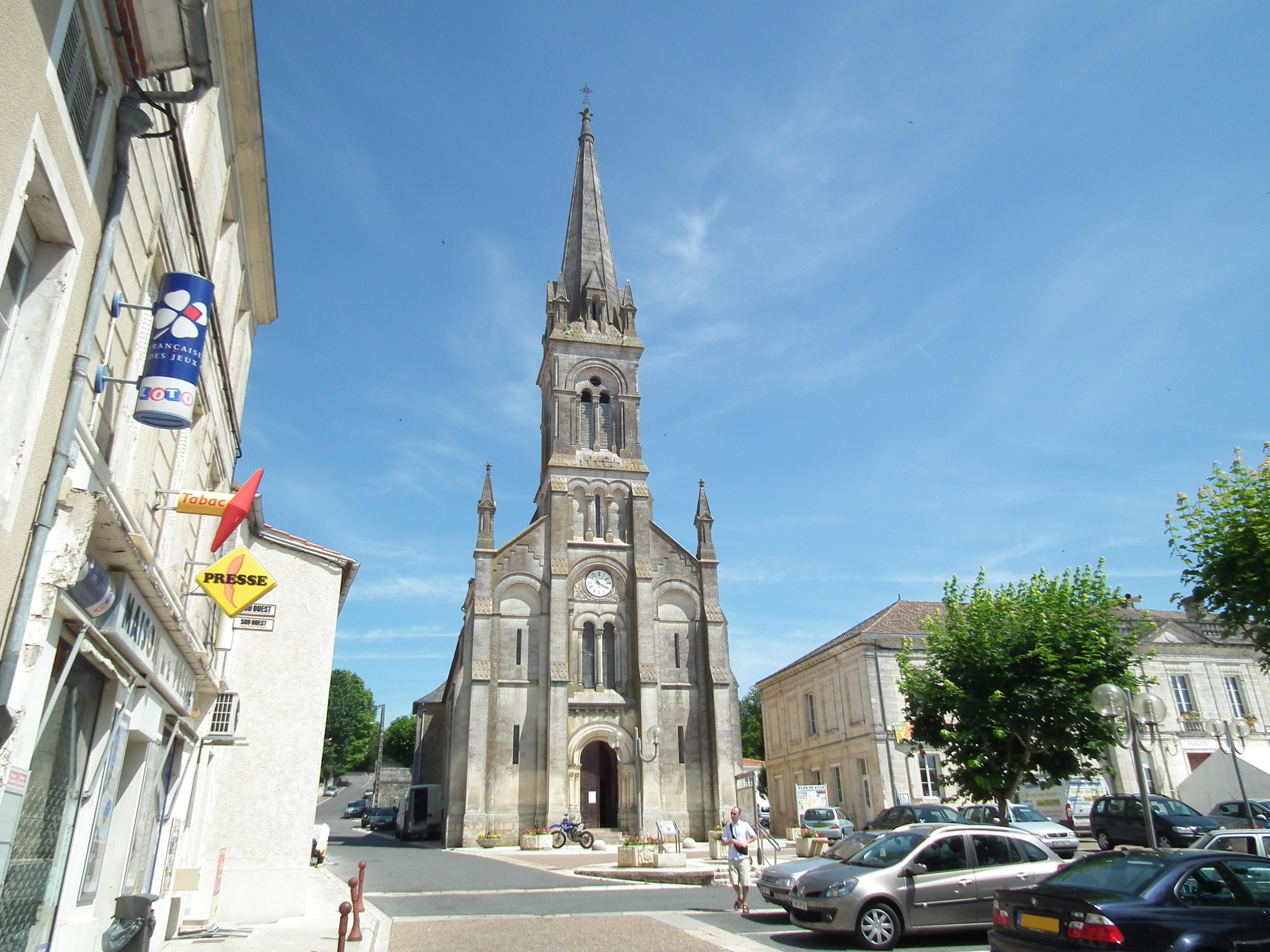
- The church and surroundings in Mirambeau

- Coat of arms
- Location of Mirambeau
- Location within France Location within Nouvelle-Aquitaine
- Coordinates: 45°22′27″N 0°34′09″W
- Country: France
- Region: Nouvelle-Aquitaine
- Department: Charente-Maritime
- Arrondissement: Jonzac
- Canton: Pons

Government
  - Mayor (2024–2026): Gérard Leclerc
- Area^{1}: 26.94 km^{2} (10.40 sq mi)
- Highest elevation: 108 m (354 ft)
- Lowest elevation: 9 m (30 ft)
- Population (2023): 1,520
  - Density: 56.4/km^{2} (146/sq mi)
- Time zone: UTC+01:00 (CET)
  - Summer (DST): UTC+02:00 (CEST)
- INSEE/Postal code: 17236 /17150
- ^{1} French Land Register data, which excludes lakes, ponds, glaciers > 1 km^{2} (0.386 sq mi or 247 acres) and river estuaries.

Mirambeau (French pronunciation: [miʁɑ̃bo]) is a commune in the Charente-Maritime department in the Nouvelle-Aquitaine region in southwestern France.

Mirambeau is situated on the Via Turonensis, the ancient pilgrimage route from Paris to Santiago de Compostela via Tours.

== Population ==
Historical population
Year	Pop.	±% p.a.
1968	1,541	—
1975	1,364	−1.73%
1982	1,344	−0.21%
1990	1,409	+0.59%
1999	1,461	+0.40%
2007	1,470	+0.08%
2012	1,491	+0.28%
2017	1,492	+0.01%
2023	1,520	+0.31%
Source: INSEE

The inhabitants of the town of Mirambeau are called Mirambeaulais.

== Chateau Mirambeau ==
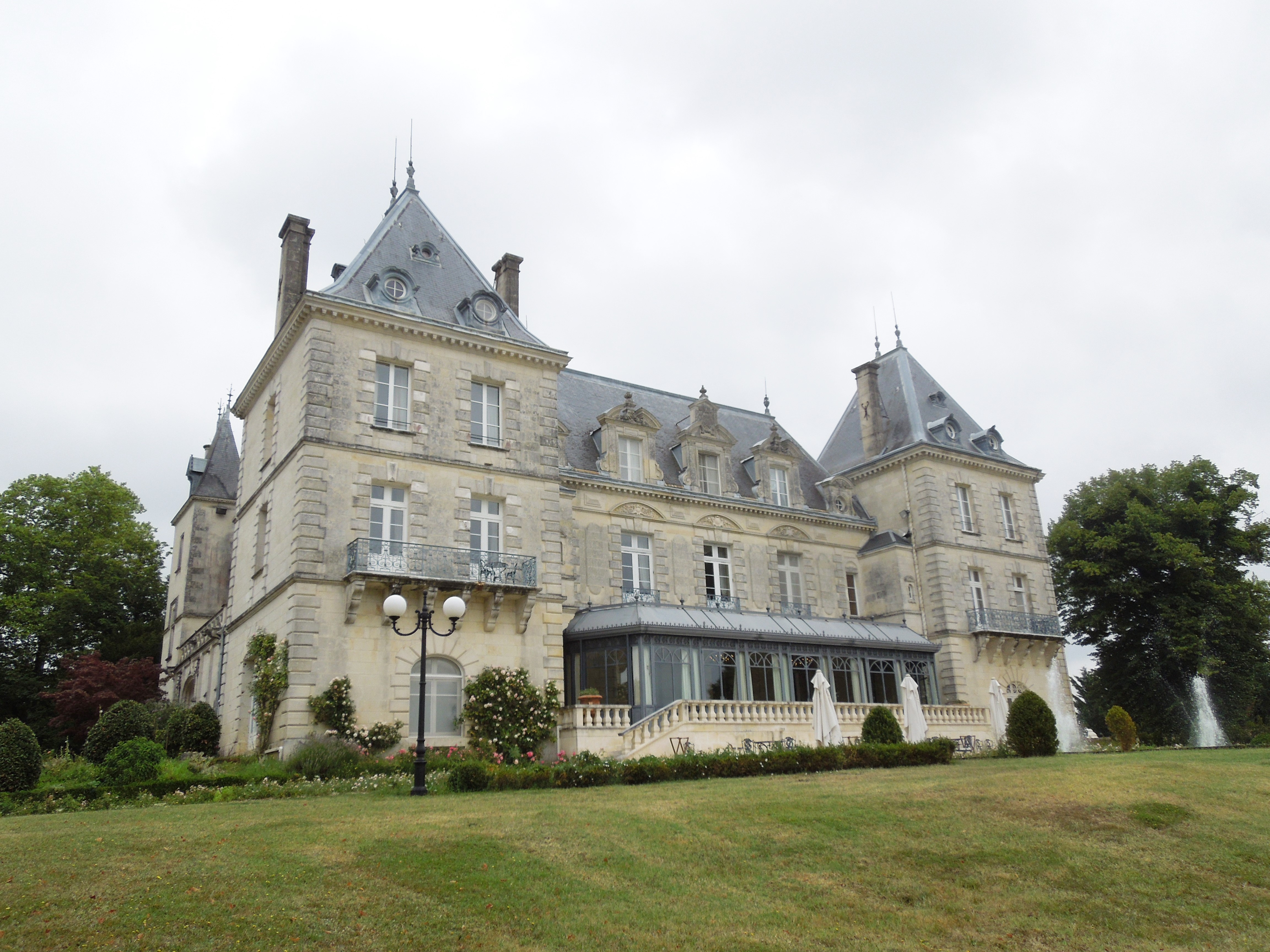
Chateau Mirambeau

First mentioned in the 11th century, the magnificent Chateau Mirambeau is situated on a 40 metre high hill overlooking the town. Today it is used as a 5-star hotel with 22 rooms and a restaurant.

== See also ==
- Communes of the Charente-Maritime department
