= M40 minibus crash =

Fatal collision on the M40 motorway

Coordinates: 52.2643°N 1.6276°W

- Date: Thursday 18 November 1993
- Location: M40 motorway near Warwick, England
- Deaths: 13
- Injuries: 4
- Property damage: Minibus destroyed; motorway maintenance vehicle damaged; road surface scorched

On 18 November 1993, just after midnight, a minibus was involved in a fatal collision with a maintenance vehicle on the M40 motorway near Warwick, England. The minibus was transporting 14 children home to Worcestershire from a school trip to the Royal Albert Hall in London when it veered into the rear of the motorway maintenance lorry which was stationary on the hard shoulder. Twelve of the children, and their teacher who was driving, died in the crash, which is one of the worst on the British road network. The two survivors sustained minor injuries, as did the people in the motorway maintenance lorry.

== Circumstances ==
On the afternoon of 17 November, Eleanor Fry, a 35-year-old teacher at Hagley RC High School in Hagley, Worcestershire, drove 14 twelve- and thirteen-year-old children to London to attend a concert at the Royal Albert Hall. Fry, a competent and experienced driver, had driven the 1982 Ford Transit a limited number of times in the UK (the minibus had been bought from Edgecliff High School, been resprayed navy blue with Hagley livery, stolen, stripped of the livery and reacquired) and the van had passed its MOT test two weeks previously.

On their return journey, shortly after midnight, the minibus Fry was driving struck a 12.5-long-ton (12.7 t) Bedford motorway maintenance truck parked on the hard shoulder of an unlit stretch of the M40 near junction 15 in Warwickshire. The truck's hazard lights were flashing. The minibus, which was estimated to be travelling at 73–84 miles per hour (117–135 km/h) at the time of the collision, exploded shortly after the crash and the bodies of several victims remained trapped in the wreckage. Some of the victims were pulled from the wreckage by passing motorists who stopped to assist. A pathologist later found evidence that Fry was either taking off or putting on her spectacles at the time of the crash.

Fry and ten of the children died at the scene. Two other children died later in hospital from their injuries and two who survived the crash recovered from relatively minor injuries. The two occupants of the lorry also suffered minor injuries. Three men who were in the maintenance lorry were unhurt and pulled seven of the minibus occupants clear of the wreckage.

A second minibus carrying another group of pupils from the school who had also attended the London concert passed the crash scene. Its driver, another teacher at the school, told how he had a "feeling of dread" that the crashed vehicle on the hard shoulder was the other minibus, but had decided to continue driving as the emergency services were already there and he did not want to worry the pupils travelling in his minibus. A Warwickshire Fire Brigade public relations officer said that the driver of the second minibus had "saved those children from witnessing the worst accident any of us has ever seen."

== Aftermath ==
The day after the crash, journalists gathered outside the school in Hagley, documenting the reaction of staff and pupils. The news media were managed by the authorities, with journalists corralled off from the school, in exchange for being provided with human interest information for their stories. Most national newspapers carried a photograph of two grieving schoolgirls, who were clearly identifiable from the picture; readers complained in writing that they considered this to be insensitive and an invasion of the girls' privacy.

Some newspapers were criticised for sensationalism and invasion of privacy, but the BBC was criticised by journalists for the opposite: the BBC's evening news programme on the day, the Nine O'Clock News, carried the story about the crash as its third item.

Several memorials were unveiled at Hagley RC High School, including a stained-glass window and a music suite. The stained-glass window, on the school's stairway, measures 14 by 3 feet (4.27 m × 0.91 m) and includes an inscription listing the victims and a musical score and instruments.

A public memorial was also erected by the district council in Brinton Park, Kidderminster. Senses Garden was constructed, free of charge, by local builders, landscape architects, and plant experts. A carved wood memorial plaque in the garden commemorates those who died in the crash.

A charity record was issued in 1994, to commemorate the victims of the crash. The song "Perpetual Light" was performed by ELO Part II member Eric Troyer and the Hagley R.C. High School Choir.

An inquest into the crash in June 1994 recorded a verdict of accidental death on each of the victims. The inquest's most significant findings were that the minibus was not fitted with seatbelts, as legislation did not require minibuses or coaches to be at the time. The law was changed in 1997 to make seatbelts standard equipment on all minibuses and coaches as well as outlawing the "crew bus" – a minibus in which two opposing benches face towards each other – and promoting the forward-facing coach.

After the crash a bus safety training package called Belt Up School Kids (BUSK) for pupils and teachers was established. It comprised safety training, in-class training for pupils, teachers, parents, voluntary personnel, and governors, and driver training, as well as advice to drivers on how to progress towards passenger-carrying vehicle (PCV) driving standards.

Several charities were formed in the wake of the collision. One was Brambles Trust, offering support to bereaved children, which was set up by the parents of one of the victims. By 2002, four years after the charity was founded, it had helped 129 families across Worcestershire and the Black Country. That year it was awarded £75,000 by Children in Need and £270,000 from the Community Fund.

On 20 May 2001, the central carved panel of the plaque in the memorial garden in Kidderminster was stolen by thieves who cut through steel bands that had secured the carving to a steel spike fixed to the ground. The artist who carved the memorial stated that it was irreplaceable because of the age of the wood.

== See also ==
- 2004 Ingoldmells bus crash
- 2010 Keswick coach accident
- Sierre coach crash (2012)
- 2019 Totnes bus crash
