= Coulombiers, Vienne =

Coulombiers
- Commune
- Location of Coulombiers
- Location within France Location within Nouvelle-Aquitaine
- Coordinates: 46°29′08″N 0°11′08″E
- Country: France
- Region: Nouvelle-Aquitaine
- Department: Vienne
- Arrondissement: Poitiers
- Canton: Lusignan
- Intercommunality: CU Grand Poitiers

Government
  - Mayor (2020–2026): Isabelle Mopin
- Area^{1}: 27.93 km^{2} (10.78 sq mi)
- Highest elevation: 156 m (512 ft)
- Lowest elevation: 127 m (417 ft)
- Population (2023): 1,155
  - Density: 41.35/km^{2} (107.1/sq mi)
- Time zone: UTC+01:00 (CET)
  - Summer (DST): UTC+02:00 (CEST)
- INSEE/Postal code: 86083 /86600
- ^{1} French Land Register data, which excludes lakes, ponds, glaciers > 1 km^{2} (0.386 sq mi or 247 acres) and river estuaries.

Coulombiers (French pronunciation: [kulɔ̃bje]) is a commune in the Vienne department, region of Nouvelle-Aquitaine, France.

== See also ==
- Communes of the Vienne department
