= 1997 M42 motorway crash =

Motor vehicle incident in England

Coordinates: 52°21′20″N 2°2′22″W

- Date: 10 March 1997
- Time: 6:20 - 6:45 a.m. approx.
- Location: Bromsgrove, Worcestershire, England
- Deaths: 3
- Injuries: ~60
- Property damage: 160 vehicles damaged or destroyed; road surface scorched
- Convictions: David Fairclough, lorry driver (3 months, dangerous driving)

On 10 March 1997 a multiple-vehicle collision occurred on the M42 motorway near Bromsgrove, Worcestershire. Three people were killed and more than 60 others were injured in the crash, which happened in dense fog during the early morning rush hour.

At around 6:20 a.m. a lorry, driven by David Fairclough of Wednesfield, entered the M42 from a slip-road at a speed of 56 miles per hour (90 km/h) and, after slowing to 32 miles per hour (51 km/h), rammed into the rear of a tanker, which then struck a car in front and exploded. The ensuing pile-up involved 160 vehicles on a 400-yard (370 m) stretch of the motorway, including 30 on the opposite carriageway 20 minutes later.

Five air ambulances and 25 ambulances ferried injured drivers and passengers from the scene to three hospitals. A police car was also involved in the pile-up; one firefighter responding to the crash criticised other motorists for overtaking his fire engine in excess of 70 miles per hour (110 km/h) in the dense fog. Several cars and lorries were burnt to a shell and more than 30 occupants had to be cut free from their vehicles by firefighters.

Lisa Dodson, a 21-year-old student from Chaddesley Corbett, was the driver of the car, a Peugeot 205, struck by the tanker and she died from asphyxiation. Malcolm MacDonald, 53 and from Redditch, and 63-year-old Margaret Vining, from Gloucester, suffered fatal injuries in the pile-up.

Fairclough, then aged 46, suffered bleeding to the brain and leg injuries. In 1999, he was acquitted at Worcester Crown Court of causing death by dangerous driving but convicted of dangerous driving for his role in the collision. His driving licence was suspended for four years and he served three months in Hewell Grange prison. In November 2001 he successfully brought legal action to have the licence reinstated. A judge ordered him to take an extended driving test.

== See also ==
- 1991 M4 motorway crash
- 2011 M5 motorway crash
- 2017 M1 motorway crash
