= Zimnitsa, Yambol Province =

Zimnitsa
- Location of Zimnitsa
- Coordinates: 42°34′56″N 26°36′9″E
- Country: Bulgaria
- Provinces (Oblast): Yambol

Government
  - Mayor: Milen Stamov
- Elevation: 153 m (502 ft)

Population http://grao.bg/tna/tab02.txt
  - Total: 1,862
- Time zone: UTC+2 (EET)
  - Summer (DST): UTC+3 (EEST)
- Postal Code: 8690
- Area codes: 04768, +359-4768

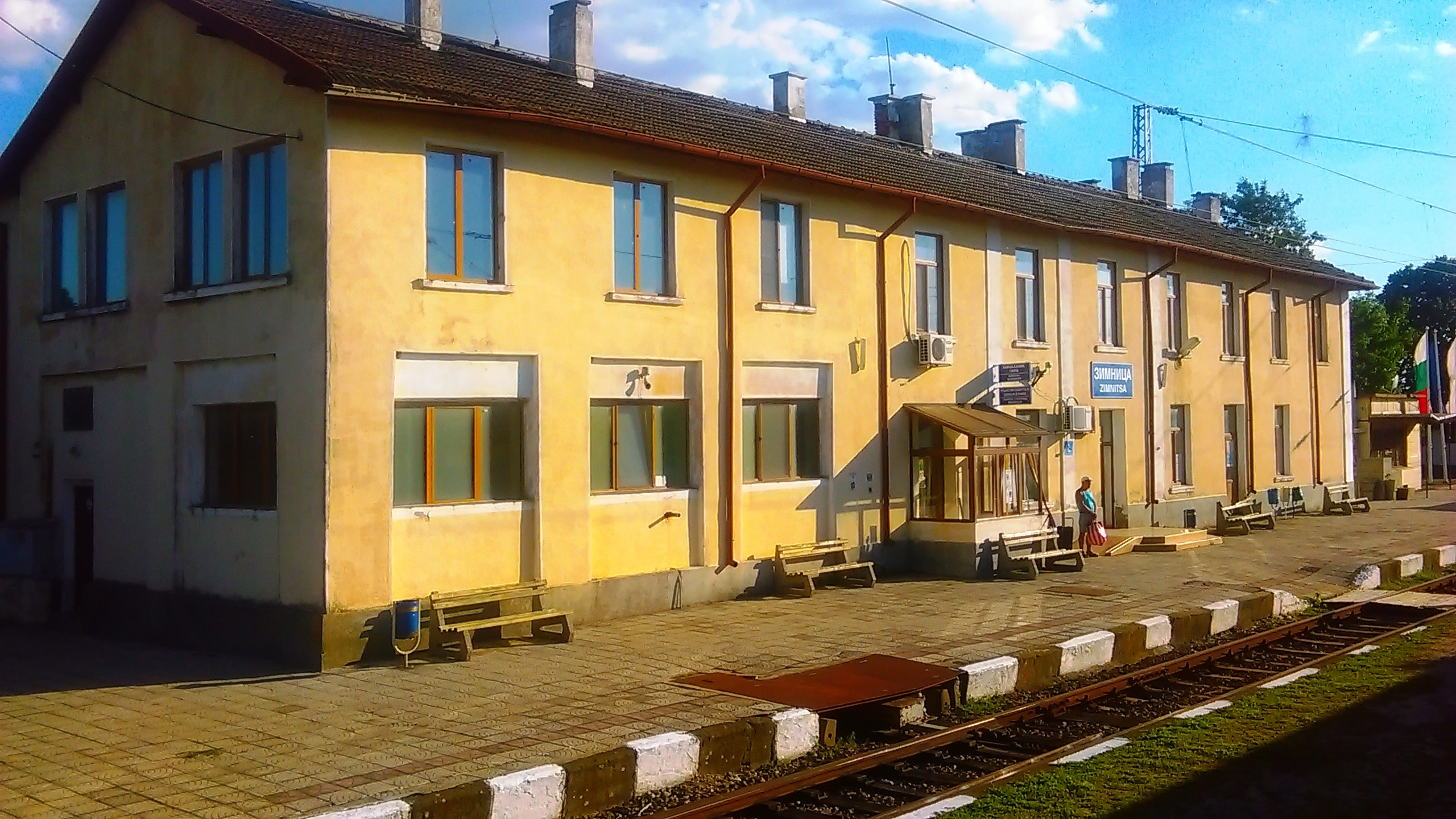
Zimnitsa railway station

Zimnitsa (Bulgarian: Зимница) is the largest village of Straldzha Municipality in southeastern Bulgaria. It is situated in the Sliven Valley. Zimnitsa is an important railway junction.

== History ==
The first settlers came to the current location of the village in 1812 from a village called Karasarli which was to the north of nowadays Zimnitsa. They worked on the sheepfold of a local Ottoman lord (pasha), so the settlement was named "Kishlakoy" (turk.kishla-sheepfold; koy-village). The church was built in 1856 and saved the population during bandit attacks. In 1906 the village was renamed Zimnitsa.

== Economy ==
Agriculture remains the main occupation of the local people. Many of them, however, work in the closest towns - Straldzha and Yambol.
