= Keswick School =

Location
- Vicarage Hill; Keswick, Cumbria, CA12 5QB; England; 54.6079°N 3.1467°W

Information
- Type: Academy
- Motto: "Levavi Oculos" "(I Lift Up My Eyes)"
- Local authority: Cumberland Council
- Department for Education URN: 136902 Tables
- Ofsted: Reports
- Head teacher: Simon Jackson
- Gender: Mixed
- Age: 11 to 18
- Enrolment: 1360
- Houses: Wordsworth, Southey, Coleridge, Rawnsley
- Colours: Bottle green and maroon
- Website: www.keswick.cumbria.sch.uk

Keswick School is a coeducational 11–18 academy in Cumbria, England. There are 1200 pupils on roll, with 260 students in the sixth form and 40 boarders.

== History ==
The school is the successor of the former voluntary aided grammar school of Keswick, founded at the latest by 1591.

The symbols on the school crest are a reference to the miracles of Saint Mungo. When the school was a Grammar School, it had a school song in Latin which began "Assurgit Skidda stabilis / Mons nunquam non durabilis", referring to the nearby Skiddaw.

== School performance and inspections ==
As of 2024, the school's most recent inspection by Ofsted was in 2024, with a judgement of 'Outstanding' in all categories.

== 2010 crash and pupil deaths ==
Two pupils of the school and a man were killed on 24 May 2010 when a coach taking pupils home was involved in a traffic collision on the A66 road.

== Notable former pupils ==
- Gavin Bland, fell runner
- Mark Donovan, cyclist
- Jessica Edgar, racing driver
- George Ellis, athlete
- Archie Evans, teacher and army officer
- Janet Nelson, historian
- Carol Tyson, racewalker
- Abbie Ward, rugby union player

== Notable staff ==
- Cecil Grant
