= Persecution of Czechs in the Slovak State =

WW2-era persecution

Persecution of Czechs occurred throughout the existence of the Slovak State (1939–1945).

== History ==
Before it seized power, the Slovak People's Party (HSĽS) was known for its anti-Czech rhetoric. Many HSĽS politicians believed that Czech language and culture threatened Slovak identity, and disliked Czech liberalism as much as they had disliked Hungarian liberalism. Tensions were exacerbated by the increase in the number of Czechs living in the country, from 7,468 before the founding of Czechoslovakia in 1918 to 93,143 in 1938. Excluding the military, 21,541 Czechs worked for the government and an additional 36,000 in private employment. They had been brought in due to the lack of native intelligentsia in Slovakia at the time, but gradually became viewed as unwelcome competition.

From when HSĽS declared its autonomy in 1938 and established an authoritarian regime, the party denounced Czechs as "enemies and pests" of the nation along with the Jews. Some of the anti-Czech slogans were: "Slovensko Slovákom" (Slovakia for the Slovaks), "Von s Čechmi" (Out with the Czechs), "Česi peši do Prahy" (Czechs go back to Prague), and "Česi peši do Prahy a to hneď" (Czechs go back to Prague right away). Anti-Czech attacks by the Hlinka Guard were so severe that the government interfered in order to preserve Slovakia's international reputation. Initially the HSĽS government debated as to whether all Czechs or just government employees should be expelled from the country. Persecution of the Czechs was also supported by other Slovak parties, including the Slovak National Party and the Agrarian Party. On 10 December 1938, the autonomous Slovak government signed an agreement with the Czechoslovak government for the transfer of 9,000 Czech civil servants—mostly those without a permanent contract—out of Slovakia.

After the independence of Slovakia in March 1939, the government ignored the agreement and fired all Czech civil servants, except those deemed indispensable. Regulation 4003/1939 ordered the creation of a list of "Communists, Marxists, and Czechs" in the new country. Czechs suffered physical attacks and discrimination; many were fired from civil service. According to different estimates, 50,000 left Slovakia, or 60,000 were deported. In many cases, local Hlinka Guard units deported Czechs to the border out of their own initiative and robbed them. Due to the government's effort to secure an ethnic Slovak majority in the capital, the number of Czechs in Bratislava decreased by 16,000 between the censuses of December 1938 and December 1940, either due to emigration or manipulation. Persecution worsened after the Slovak National Uprising because Czechs were perceived as sympathetic to the partisans. The discrimination led to protests by the Czechoslovak government-in-exile.
