= Alexander Mach =

Slovak politician

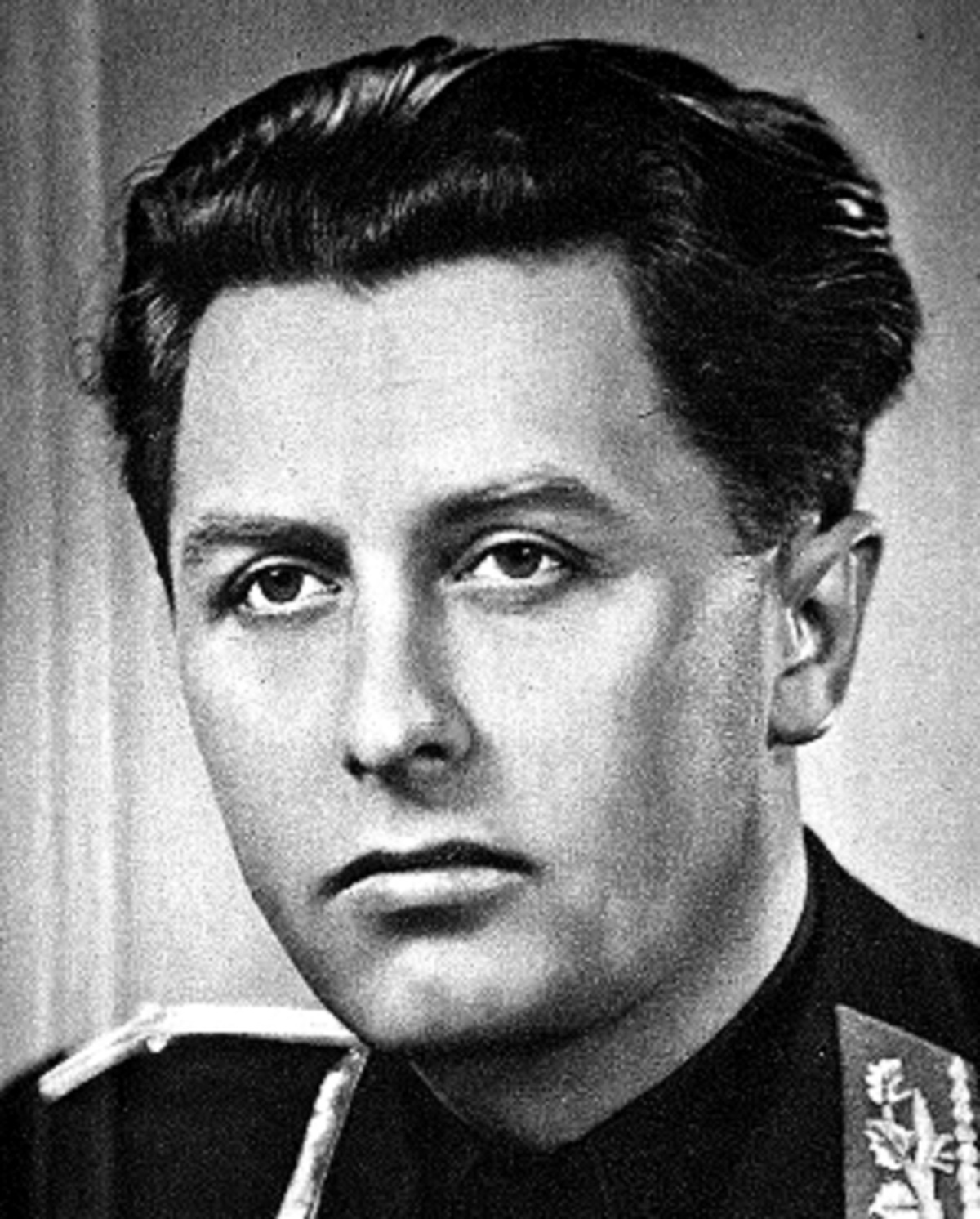
- Born: Alexander Mach; 11 October 1902; Slovenský Meder, Nyitra County, Kingdom of Hungary
- Died: 15 October 1980 (aged 78); Bratislava, Czechoslovakia
- Citizenship: Czechoslovak
- Known for: Politician
- Title: Head of the Hlinka Guard
- Term: 1939–1945
- Predecessor: Karol Sidor
- Successor: Post abolished
- Political party: Slovak People's Party
- Status: Deceased
- Conviction: Treason
- Penalty: 30 years imprisonment

Alexander Mach (11 October 1902 – 15 October 1980), (pseud. Alexander Mach Mederský) was a Slovak nationalist politician. Mach was associated with the far right wing of Slovak nationalism and became noted for his strong support of Nazism and Germany.

== Early years ==
Mach joined the Slovak People's Party at an early age and came to prominence within that movement as an aide to Vojtech Tuka. Under Tuka's tutelage Mach was editor of the party organs Slovák and Slovenská Pravda and was appointed to the party's political committee in 1924. He belonged to the non-clerical wing of the Slovak People's Party, which has been portrayed as the more pro-Nazi of the party's two factions. He also was chief executive of the Rodobrana during that group's mid-1920s heyday. An influential figure on party policy, an editorial he wrote in 1938 calling for the establishment of a paramilitary arm to the party led directly to the formation of the Hlinka Guard. Mach would succeed Karol Sidor as commander of this group in March 1939 with Karol Murgaš as his chief of staff.

== Slovak Republic ==
Mach came to the fore in 1938 after the Munich Agreement and subsequent upsurge in Slovak nationalism as a close associate of Vojtech Tuka and Ferdinand Ďurčanský. Known for his rabble-rousing, Mach played a leading role in orchestrating the violence that followed the collapse of Czechoslovakia in March 1939 in his role as head of the Slovak Office of Propaganda. He initially was Propaganda Chief the first Slovak Republic before holding the position of Interior Minister in the government of Tuka from 29 July 1940 until the state's collapse in 1944.

Like Tuka, whom Mach often deputised for during the Prime Minister's regular spells of illness, he supported a pro-Nazi policy and the speedy establishment of a fascist state, something which led to frequent clashes with the less ideologically minded President Jozef Tiso. Tiso managed to briefly deprive Mach of his position in the Hlinka Guard in May 1940 although Mach's pro-German stance meant the Nazis backed him for high office consistently. In 1941 Mach even drew up plans to establish concentration camps in Slovakia for the Germans although the plan was abandoned when they decided to concentrate on Poland and the east as the location for such initiative.

== Later life ==
A staunch supporter of Nazi Germany, Mach fled Slovakia after the collapse of its puppet government in 1944 and relocated to Vienna where he was declared Minister of Home Affairs in a pro-Nazi government-in-exile. Arrested by the Czechoslovak authorities after the end of the Second World War he was tried before a People's Court and sentenced to thirty years imprisonment for his role in collaboration. The leniency of the sentence surprised both onlookers and Mach himself, who had expressed remorse at his trial but still expected to be executed. Mach was also ordered to forfeit his civil rights for 15 years and had a quarter of his property confiscated. He was released from prison in 1968 and settled in Bratislava, living on a state pension until his death in 1980.
