= Otomar Kubala =

Slovak fascist and commander

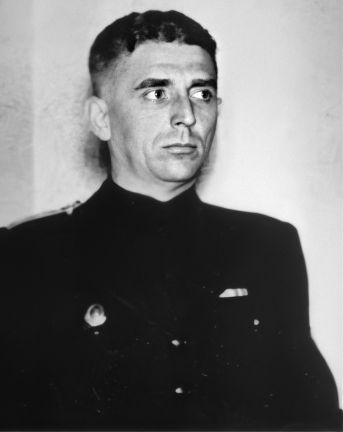
- Otomar Kubala
- Born: 26 January 1906; Nova Vesz, Austria-Hungary
- Died: 28 August 1946 (aged 40) Bratislava, Czechoslovakia
- Cause of death: Execution by firing squad
- Allegiance: Slovak State
- Service years: 1938–1945
- Conflicts: World War II

Otomar Kubala (26 January 1906 – 28 August 1946) was a Slovak fascist who served as the commander of the Hlinka Guard during the Slovak National Uprising. After the war, he was tried for treason, convicted, and executed.

== Life and career ==
Kubala studied at a teacher institution in Modra from 1920 to 1924 and then worked as a teacher and principal for 10 years. Kubala joined the Hlinka Guard in November 1938, and was later the local commander in 1939. He was already publishing articles with fascist ideals in the Gardista newspaper in the 1930s and in 1941 became the editor-in-chief of the Gardista newspaper.

=== Death ===
Due to the Red Army's gradual advance on Slovakia, Kubala organized a retreat of remaining Slovak units and withdrew to southern Bohemia, where he surrendered to American forces at Strakonice. He then was extradited to Czechoslovak authorities, sentenced to death by firing squad for crimes against humanity, and executed as a war criminal.
