= Karol Sidor =

Slovak politician

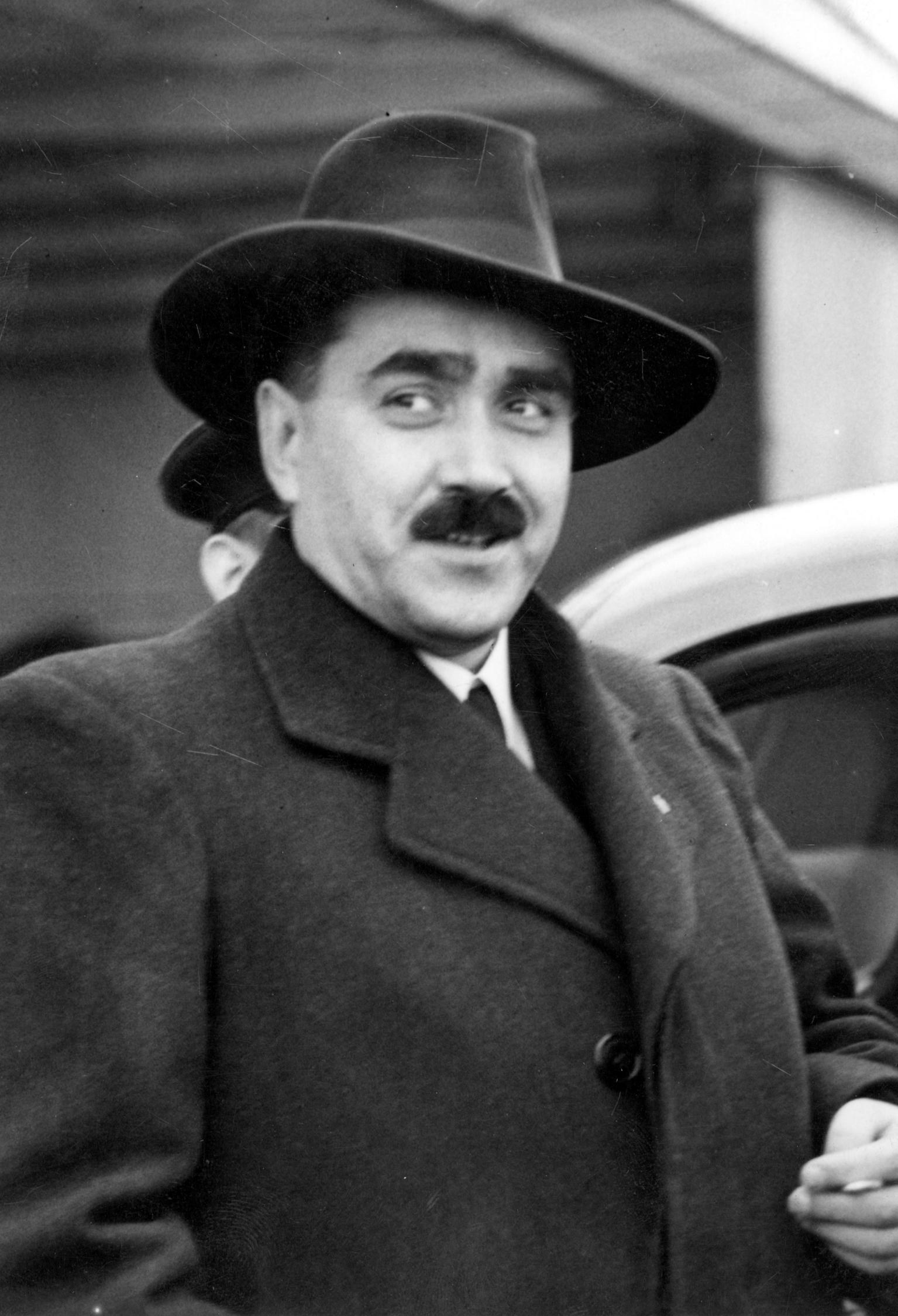
- Sidor at Warsaw Airport, 19 October 1938
- Born: Karol Sidor; 16 July 1901; Rózsahegy, Kingdom of Hungary, Austria-Hungary
- Died: 20 October 1953 (aged 52); Montreal, Quebec, Canada
- Citizenship: Czechoslovak
- Known for: Politician
- Title: Minister for Slovak Affairs
- Term: 1938
- Political party: Slovak People's Party

Karol Sidor (16 July 1901 – 20 October 1953) was a Slovak nationalist politician and journalist. Active from an early age, he was undecided about full independence and as a result was largely sidelined during the Slovak Republic.

== Political activity ==
A devout Roman Catholic, he was born in Rózsahegy (Ružomberok) in the Liptó County of the Kingdom of Hungary (present-day Slovakia) and came to politics early as a low-level supporter of Andrej Hlinka. He would later write a biography of Hlinka, his political idol. After finishing his education he joined the Slovak People's Party (SPP) and became one of its leading members on the pro-Poland wing. Before long however he would become associated with the Ferdinand Ďurčanský and the Vojtech Tuka wings of the party. He was elected to parliament in 1935 and, ironically given his early ideas, was chosen to argue against Poland's claims on Slovak territory.

Sidor was also commander of the Hlinka Guard and had been touted as a successor to the priest, although this did not happen. He was given the position of Minister for Slovak Affairs by the Czechoslovak government in 1938, a role which took him away from the radicals of the SPP, allowing Jozef Tiso to take control ahead of him. Wary of Nazi Germany, he rejected a move from Artur Seyss-Inquart to declare independence in 1939, leading to the Nazis concentrating their efforts on Tiso instead. When independence was declared Sidor served as Minister of the Interior for little over a month in 1939 before their pressure forced him out. Sidor was a strong anti-Semite but nevertheless he had reservations about the Nazis and would later serve in only the very minor role of Minister to the Holy See. From January to March 1939 he also led a commission to examine the "Jewish question" in Slovakia, albeit nothing came of this initiative and ultimately the issue would be taken over by the Nazis.

== Exile ==
In his diplomatic role Sidor became de facto an exilé in Vatican, because the Nazi authorities never gave him the transit permission over territories under their control, effectively preventing him to return to Slovakia for the rest of the war. As the war ended, Nazi Germany and its satellites were defeated and Slovakia again became part of Czechoslovakia, Sidor was forced to left Vatican for the west, ultimately settling in Montreal, Quebec, Canada. He had initially been refused asylum by the Government of Canada who considered him a persona non grata but they changed their minds in 1950 following the intervention of Pope Pius XII. Sidor had remained in the Vatican and his presence in Rome had become a source of some embarrassment to the Pope given Sidor's conduct in the war. He was sentenced in absentia to 20 years by a Czechoslovak court in 1947.

Sidor received a U.S. passport by 1947.

Sidor died in Canada without serving the sentence.
