= Slovensko Slovákom =

Slovak phrase

The Slovak phrase Slovensko Slovákom (meaning "Slovakia belongs to Slovaks") has been used as an ethnonationalist slogan by the Slovak People's Party in favor of Slovak autonomy within Czechoslovakia, anti-Czech sentiment during the Slovak State era, and also an antisemitic message ("Slovensko Slovákom, Palestína Arabom"—"Slovakia belongs to the Slovaks, Palestine to the Arabs"). In the twenty-first century, it is still used by Slovak nationalists opposed to the EU and by the Kotleba party.

== See also ==
- Na stráž
- British League of Ex-Servicemen and Women § Fascism — Slogan Britain for the British
- Zionist antisemitism
