= Slovak People's Party =

Slovak far-right clerico-fascist political party of the 1930s

Hlinka's Slovak People's Party Hlinkova slovenská ľudová strana
- Abbreviation: HSĽS-SSNJ (from 1938)
- Founder: Andrej Hlinka
- Founded: 29 July 1913; 113 years ago
- Banned: 1945; 81 years ago
- Split from: Slovak National Party
- Newspaper: Slovák
- Youth wing: Hlinka Youth
- Paramilitary wing: Hlinka Guard (1938–45)
- Membership: 36,000 (1936 est.)
- Ideology: Slovak clerical fascism; Slovak ultranationalism; Political Catholicism; Corporate statism; Social conservatism; Anti-Hungarianism; Factions: Pro-Nazism; Nástupists (until 1940)
- Political position: Far-right
- Religion: Roman Catholicism
- Electoral alliance: ČSL-SĽS (1920); Autonomous Bloc (1935); United List (1938)
- International affiliation: White International (attendee)
- Colours: White Blue Red
- Slogan: Slovensko Slovákom (lit. 'Slovakia for Slovaks')

Party flag
- Other flag
- Politics of Slovakia; Political parties; Elections; a: Predecessor: Rodobrana (1923–27)

Hlinka's Slovak People's Party (Slovak: Hlinkova slovenská ľudová strana), also known as the Slovak People's Party (Slovenská ľudová strana, SĽS) or the Hlinka Party, was a far-right clerico-fascist political party with a strong Catholic fundamentalist and authoritarian ideology. Its members were often called ľudáci (Ľudáks, singular: ľudák).

The party arose at a time when Slovakia was still part of Austria-Hungary and fought for democratic liberties, the independence and sovereignty of Slovakia, and against the influence of liberalism. After the formation of Czechoslovakia, the party preserved its conservative ideology, opposing Czechoslovakism and demanding Slovak autonomy. In the second half of the 1930s, the rise of totalitarian regimes in Europe and the party's inability to achieve long-term political objectives caused a loss of the party's faith in democratic procedures and saw the party turn towards more radical and extremist ideologies such as fascism.

After a merger with other parties in November 1938, which formed the Hlinka's Slovak People's Party – Party of Slovak National Unity, it became the dominant party of the Slovak Republic. In addition to adopting a totalitarian vision of the state, it included an openly pro-Nazi faction, which dominated Slovak policy between 1940 and 1942. The party's chairmen were the Slovak priests Andrej Hlinka (1913–1938) and later Jozef Tiso (1939–1945), and its main newspapers were the Slovenské ľudové noviny (Slovak People's News, 1910–1930), Slovák (Slovak, 1919–1945) and Slovenská pravda (Slovak Truth, 1936–1945).

== History ==
=== Austria-Hungary (1905–1918) ===
The creation process of the party took several years. With the exception of the short-lived Slovak Social Democratic Party (1905–1906), there was only one party in Austria-Hungary that specifically promoted the interests of the Slovaks at the turn of the 19th and 20th century — the Slovak National Party (SNS). The Slovak People's movement was established within the Hungarian People's Party (Néppárt, founded in 1895) which opposed liberalism and was popular amongst the religious Slovak population. The party's program addressed several other problems of Slovak society including emigration, usury, corruption and forced magyarization. Due to the gradual shift away from these values, Slovak politicians began to form a separate group within the party. The party hierarchy reacted in November 1905 by asking its only MP, František Skyčák, to sign a testimony against the Slovak program. Skyčák refused and on 5 December 1905, he published a declaration of a new political party.

Other personalities, among them the Catholic priest Andrej Hlinka, joined the organisation in early 1906, before the Slovak National Party (SĽS) was officially formed on 18 March 1906 by Skyčák, Milan Hodža and A. Ráth. However, following a decision in April 1906, the party contested elections as part of the Slovak National Party until 1913 in order to prevent splitting the Slovak vote. However, their programmes were nearly identical; the SĽS called for strong democratization and included liberal reforms such as freedom of speech and universal suffrage. Despite the frequent electoral manipulations in Hungary at that time, the SĽS won six deputies and the SNS won one deputy. out of the 415 deputies of the Hungarian Diet in the 1906 parliamentary elections. The Hungarian government immediately reacted by implementing increasingly repressive measures to suppress the national and political consciousness and awareness of Slovaks.

In 1912, the SĽS refused to support the strong Czechoslovakist orientation of the SNS prevailing at that time, and made a similar declaration as in 1905, again without formal effects. On 19 July 1913, the SĽS became a separate political party with Hlinka as chairman and Ferdiš Juriga and Skyčák amongst its leadership. During World War I, the SĽS (just like the SNS) went into abeyance in order to prevent any possible pretext for accusations of activities against the Austro-Hungarian state. In 1918, Hlinka and Juriga staunchly supported the idea of a common Czechoslovak state and signed the Martin Declaration which rejected Hungarian jurisdiction and rule over Slovakia. The party participated in the creation of the Second Slovak National Council that existed from October 1918 to January 1919 and its leaders helped to consolidate the situation in Czechoslovakia during the first weeks of its existence.

=== First Czechoslovak Republic (1918–1938) ===
After the establishment of Czechoslovakia, the SĽS renewed its activities on 19 December 1918 in Žilina. On 17 October 1925, it was renamed the Hlinka's Slovak People's Party (HSĽS) to distinguish it from the Czechoslovak People's Party. During the majority of the whole interwar period, the HSĽS was the most popular party in Slovakia and until 1938, was a standard part of the democratic political spectrum. The party operated mostly in opposition but not as a destructive power and remained loyal to Czechoslovakia. All of its programs had religious, national, social and constitutional values, its ideology was based on papal encyclicals Rerum novarum and Quadragesimo anno, and was oriented mostly towards its Catholic electorate. The party rejected economic liberalism and the theory of class struggle popular among socialists and communists, who were together with liberal atheists considered to be the party's main enemies. The constitutional part of its program was derived from the Pittsburgh Agreement, which promised an autonomous status of Slovakia within Czechoslovakia. The HSĽS opposed centralism and ethnic Czechoslovakism, which did not consider Slovaks as a separate and distinctive ethnic group from the Czechs. In addition to its program, the popularity of the party was maintained by Hlinka's charisma and cult of personality.

In the 1920 parliamentary elections the party participated together with the Czech People's Party under the name Czechoslovak People's Party. The alliance received 17.5% of the vote in Slovakia, making it the third largest party. Following the elections, Hlinka stated that he would "work 24 hours a day until Slovakia turns from a red Slovakia into a white and Christian Slovakia." The majority of the party's support came from Slovak farmers, mainly because the party criticized the land reforms of 1920–1929.

After the county elections in 1923, the party became the largest party in Slovakia, receiving 34.4% of the vote in the 1925 parliamentary elections. In 1923, the HSĽS founded the paramilitary Rodobrana organization to protect their meetings. Rodobrana was influenced and manipulated by Vojtech Tuka for his own anti-Czechoslovak intentions, and later it was banned by the Czechoslovak government for anti-constitutional activities. Rodobrana was inspired by Italian fascism, and became a magnet for young dissatisfied radicals, the core of the future fascist wing of the HSĽS. The HSĽS leadership attempted to bring Rodobrana under party control, and succeeded when its activities were restored in 1926. Rodobrana hosted several radicals like Alexander Mach and Ján Farkaš.

On 15 January 1927, the HSĽS became a member of the Czechoslovak government coalition after Jozef Tiso started negotiations during a foreign trip by Hlinka. The party held the Ministry of Health (Jozef Tiso) and the Ministry of the Unification of Laws and State Administration (Marek Gažík). After a controversial trial against the HSĽS member Vojtech Tuka, who was accused of high treason, the HSĽS left the government on 8 October 1929.

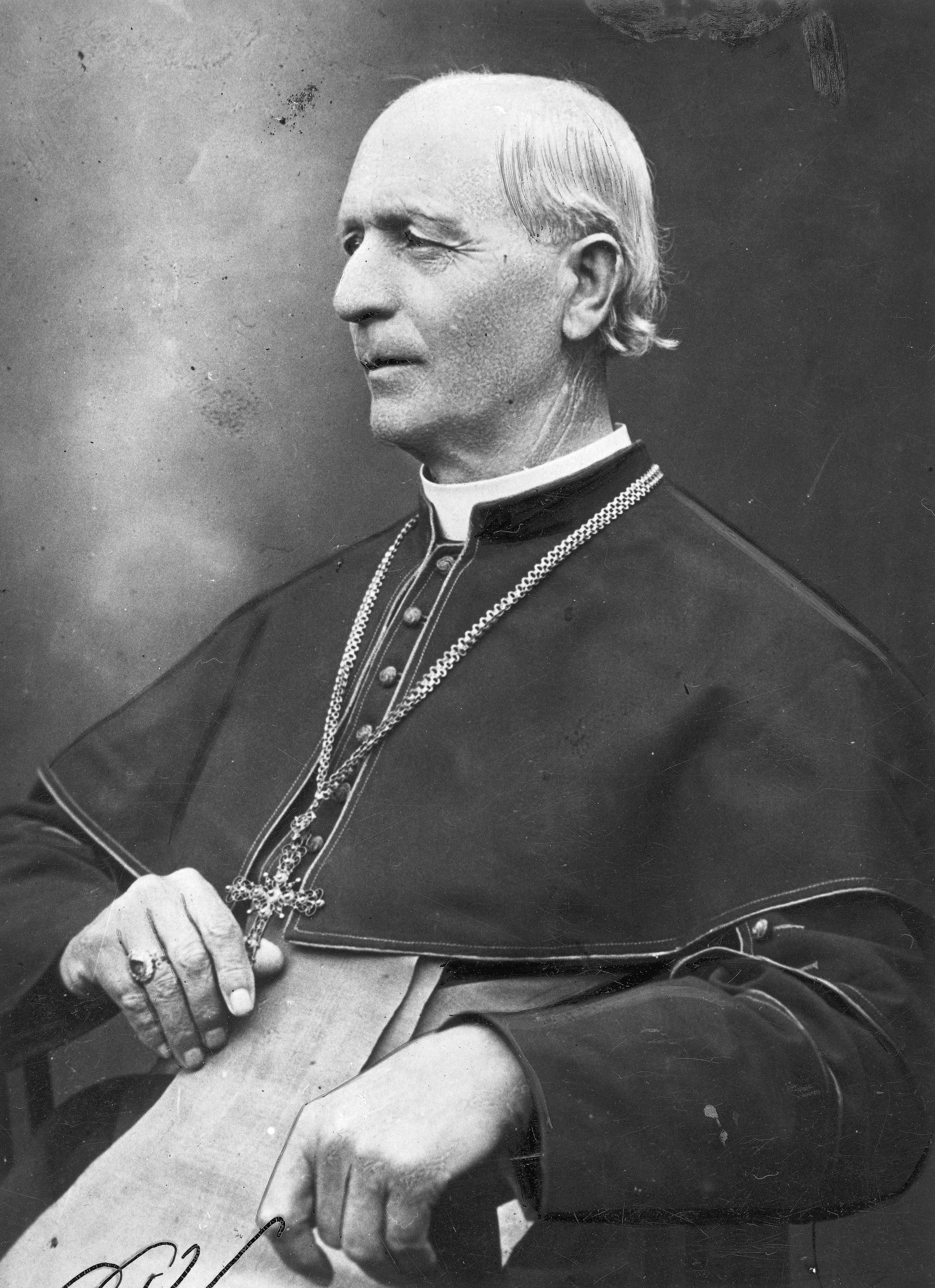
Andrej Hlinka (pictured above) was the founder of the Slovak People's Party.

In order to contest the 1935 elections, the HSĽS joined with the SNS to create the "Autonomous Block", which received 30.12% of the vote in the Slovak region of Czechoslovakia. However, it was dissolved after the elections. The HSĽS considered itself to be the only political party that vigorously defended Slovak national interests, but its inability to achieve autonomy decreased the prestige of its moderate wing and strengthened its radical members.

After the death of the 74-year old Hlinka in August 1938, the presidium of the party decided that the post of chairman would remain unoccupied. The party was subsequently led by vice-chairman Jozef Tiso until October 1939, when he became the new chairman. During the Czechoslovak crisis between the spring and fall of 1938, the HSĽS retained a common Czechoslovak platform. The party officially supported the national mobilization of Czechoslovakia against Nazi Germany and rejected the appeals of the Sudeten German Party to radicalize its position.

=== Second Czechoslovak Republic (1938–1939) ===
The situation dramatically changed in the fall of 1938. On October 6, 1938, after the Czech region of Czechoslovakia had lost its border regions to Germany following the Munich Agreement, the executive committee of the HSĽS together with most other Slovak parties declared the autonomy of Slovakia within Czechoslovakia. The Prague government accepted this declaration, and appointed Jozef Tiso as the Prime Minister of Autonomous Slovakia on the same day. The HSĽS became the dominant party in the subsequent Slovak governments. After the declaration of autonomy, internal tension between the Catholic conservative and radical fascist wings continued to grow. The conservative wing led by Tiso preserved its majority in the presidium of the party, but the radicals in turn gained influence and held important positions in new organizations like the Hlinka Guard (Hlinkova Garda) and the Slovak National Committees (Slovenské Národné Výbory).

On November 8, 1938, after the Slovak part of Czechoslovakia had lost one third of its territory to Hungary through the First Vienna Award (Vienna Arbitration), the Slovak branches of all parties except the Communists and Social Democrats merged with the HSĽS and formed the Hlinka's Slovak People's Party – Party of Slovak National Unity (HSĽS-SSNJ). The Slovak National Party joined the HSĽS-SSNJ coalition on December 15, 1938.

This new party quickly developed clearly authoritarian characteristics. It immediately subjected the leftist and Jewish parties to considerable harassment. In the December 1938 Slovak general election, the HSĽS-SSNJ coalition won 97.3% of the vote, out of which 72% went to candidates of the original HSĽS. The Social Democrats and Communists were shut out because the HSĽS-SSNJ government refused to publish new election procedures until it was too late for these parties to select their candidates. As of January 31, 1939, all parties except for the HSĽS-SSNJ, the German Party and the Unified Magyar Party (Representing the Hungarian minority) were prohibited. For all intents and purposes, Slovakia was now effectively a one-party state.

=== First Slovak Republic (1939–1945) ===
In a last-ditch attempt to save the country, the Prague government deposed Tiso as Prime Minister, replacing him with Karol Sidor. A few days later, amid massive German provocations, Hitler invited Tiso to Berlin and urged him to proclaim Slovakia's independence. Hitler added that if Tiso did not do so, he would have no interest in Slovakia's fate. During the meeting, Joachim von Ribbentrop passed on a bogus report stating that Hungarian troops were approaching Slovak borders. Tiso refused to make such a decision himself on the situation. After that, he was allowed by Hitler to organize a meeting of the Slovak parliament which would approve Slovakia's declaration of independence from Czechoslovakia.

On 14 March, the Slovak parliament convened and heard Tiso's report on his discussion with Hitler as well as a declaration of independence. Some of the deputies were skeptical of making such a move, but the debate was quickly quashed when Franz Karmasin, leader of the German minority in Slovakia, stated that any delay in declaring independence would result in Slovakia being partitioned between Hungary and Germany. Under these circumstances, the legislative chamber unanimously declared Slovak independence. Jozef Tiso was appointed the first Prime Minister of the Slovak Republic. The next day, Tiso sent a telegram, which had actually been composed the previous day in Berlin, asking the Reich to take over the protection of the newly created state. The request was readily accepted.

The HSĽS-SSNJ was the dominant force in the country, to the point that the parliamentary elections scheduled for 1943 did not take place, and it claimed to represent the nation and the social interests of all Slovak citizens. Historians describe the party as a "fascist and clerical nationalist group with ties to Nazism". After 1939, the conflict between two wings of the party continued and reached a new level of severity. The conservative wing led by the Catholic priest Jozef Tiso, the president of Slovakia and chairman of the party, wanted to create a separate authoritarian and religious state modelled on fundamentalist Christian principles. The conservative wing had no doubts about the need to build a totalitarian state, but wished to do so gradually, preserving legal and political continuity with the previous regime. The radicals, who preferred the methods and theory of Nazism, were fervent antisemites, wanted to remove all Czechs and Hungarians from the country, and intended to create a radically nationalistic and corporatist state modelled on Adolf Hitler's Nazi Germany. Their main organization was the Hlinka Guard, which was controlled by the HSĽS-SSNJ. The main representatives of the radical pro-Nazi faction were Vojtech Tuka and Alexander Mach.

In the spring of 1940, the conservative wing was close to victory over the radicals, especially when Tiso pacified the Hlinka Guard through organizational changes and bound it closer to the party's leadership. However, at the July 1940 Salzburg Conference, the Government of Germany forced changes of personnel in the Slovak government and thus reinforced the radicals. The radical wing then held the most important positions of executive power. The new Prime Minister, Vojtech Tuka, also became the Minister of Foreign Affairs. Alexander Mach then once again became the leader of the Hlinka Guard and also the Minister of the Interior. Tiso changed his tactics and verbally adopted the idea of Nazism, but maneuvered and stated that it had to be implemented in "folk and Christian spirit".

In the fall of 1940, the conservative wing began taking the initiative. Tiso undermined the already weak authority of the Slovak Parliament, and strongly rejected a proposal to replace four conservative ministers with radical Nazis. In early 1941, his faction silently thwarted a pro-Nazi coup attempt. On the other hand, Tiso allowed the radicals to take the initiative on the solution of the "Jewish Question", wrongly assuming that he can redirect all responsibility for the Holocaust to them, and later on he publicly advocated the deportations of Jews into concentration camps in Nazi Germany.

The struggle between the party's wings ended in the summer 1942 with the victory of the conservatives. Some radicals withdrew from public life, others lost their political influence or switched to the winning side, such as Alexander Mach. Due to pragmatic reasons, HSLS adopted the Führerprinzip, with a completely different purpose than in Germany, which was the preventive elimination of radicals without angering the German government. Germany naturally sympathized with the pro-Nazi radicals but allowed their opponents to win regardless. The reason was purely pragmatic, as Nazi foreign policy was more interested in a consolidated Slovakia as a model of an effective satellite state, and the conservative wing was more popular amongst the Slovak population and was widely perceived as being more qualified to manage the state. Germany however never stopped supporting the radicals and frequently utilized them to pressure the Slovak puppet state.

After the German occupation of Slovakia in 1944 and the outbreak of the Slovak National Uprising, the insurgent Slovak National Council (Slovenská národná rada or the SNR) declared the restoration of Czechoslovakia. On September 1, 1944, the SNR banned the HSĽS and all of its organisations such as the Hlinka Guard and Hlinka Youth, and confiscated their property. Although the uprising was later violently suppressed, the HSĽS never fully regained its authority. The party ceased to exist after the liberation of Slovakia by Czechoslovak troops and by the Red Army in April–May 1945. Many of the party's members and supporters were prosecuted for war crimes in post war Czechoslovakia.

== Names ==
- 1905–1925: Slovak People's Party (Slovenská ľudová strana, short SĽS)
- 1925–1938: Hlinka's Slovak People's Party (Hlinkova slovenská ľudová strana, short HSĽS)
- 1938–1945: Hlinka's Slovak People's Party – Party of Slovak National Unity (Hlinkova slovenská ľudová strana – Strana slovenskej národnej jednoty, short HSĽS-SSNJ)

== Election results ==
| Election | % in Slovakia | Notes |
|---|---|---|
| 1920 | 17.55 | Czechoslovak People's Party (together with Czech People's Party) |
| 1925 | 34.31 | |
| 1929 | 28.27 | |
| 1935 | 30.12 | Autonomous Block (together with Slovak National Party, Autonomous Agrarian Union (Ruthenian party) and Polish People's Party) |
| 1938 | 96.6 | United List (Fraudulent and rigged elections) |

== See also ==
- Andrej Hlinka
- Jozef Tiso
- Slovaks in Czechoslovakia (1918–1938)
- History of Czechoslovakia
- History of Slovakia
- Hlinka Guard – The armed wing of the party
- List of defunct paramilitary organizations

== Sources ==
- Suppan, Arnold (2004). "Catholic People's Parties in East Central Europe: The Bohemian Lands and Slovakia". Political Catholicism in Europe 1918-1945. Vol. 1. Routledge. pp. 178–192.
- Baka, Igor (2010). Politický systém a režim Slovenskej republiky v rokoch 1939 – 1940 [The political system and regime of the Slovak Republic in the years 1939 – 1940]. Bratislava: Vojenský historický ústav. ISBN 978-80-969375-9-2.
- Letz, Róbert (2006). "Hlinkova slovenská ľudová strana (Pokus o syntetický pohľad)" [Hlinka's Slovak People's Party (An attempt to present a synthetic view)]. In Letz, Róbert; Mulík, Peter; Bartlová, Alena (eds.). Slovenská ľudová strana v dejinách 1905 – 1945 (in Slovak). Martin: Matica slovenská. ISBN 80-7090-827-0.
- Ferenčuhová, Bohumila; Zemko, Milan (2012). V medzivojnovom Československu 1918–1939 [In inter-war Czechoslovakia 1918–1939] (in Slovak). Veda. ISBN 978-80-224-1199-8.
- Kamenec, Ivan (2013). Tragédia politika, kňaza a človeka (Dr. Jozef Tiso 1887-1947) [The Tragedy of a Politician, Priest and a Human (Dr. Jozef Tiso 1887-1947)] (in Slovak). Premedia. ISBN 978-80-89594-61-0.
