= Rodobrana =

Slovak paramilitary organization

Logo of Rodobrana

Rodobrana (literally Home Defense/Nation's Defense) was a Slovak paramilitary organization of the Slovak People's Party. The organization existed, officially, from 1923 to 1927 in Czechoslovakia, when the authorities ordered its dissolution, though many of its members continued to function in other party organizations. It was a predecessor of the Hlinka Guard. According to Beneš decree No. 16/1945 Coll., membership of Rodobrana was punishable by 5–20 years of imprisonment, or life in prison in case of aggravated circumstances.
