= Hlinka Guard =

Slovak fascist militia (1938–1945)

- Flag of the Hlinka Guard

- Emblem of the Hlinka Guard

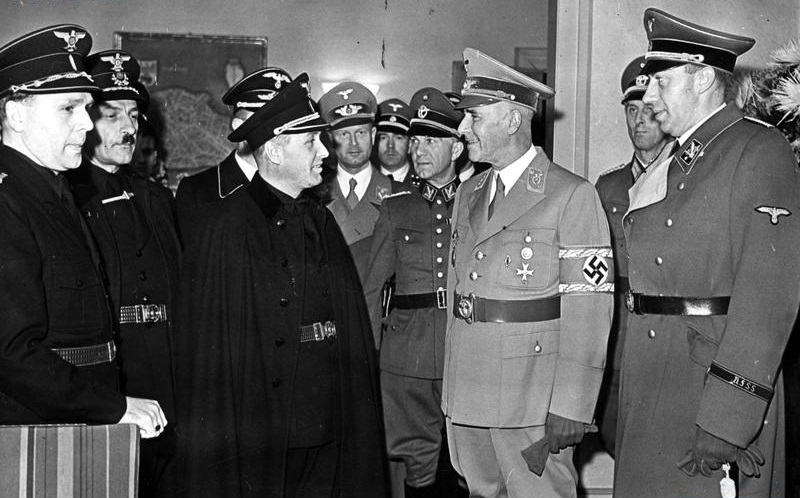
- Commander of Hlinka Guard Interior Minister Alexander Mach and German Interior Minister Wilhelm Frick visit in Nazi Germany

Agency overview
- Formed: 1938
- Preceding agency: Rodobrana
- Dissolved: 1945
- Type: Paramilitary
- Jurisdiction: Slovak Republic
- Headquarters: Bratislava
- Ministers responsible: Jozef Tiso, High Commander (1938–45); Karol Sidor, Minister of Interior (1938–39); Alexander Mach, Minister of Interior (1939–44); Otomar Kubala, Minister of Interior (1944–45)
- Parent agency: Hlinka's Slovak People's Party (HSLS-SSNJ)

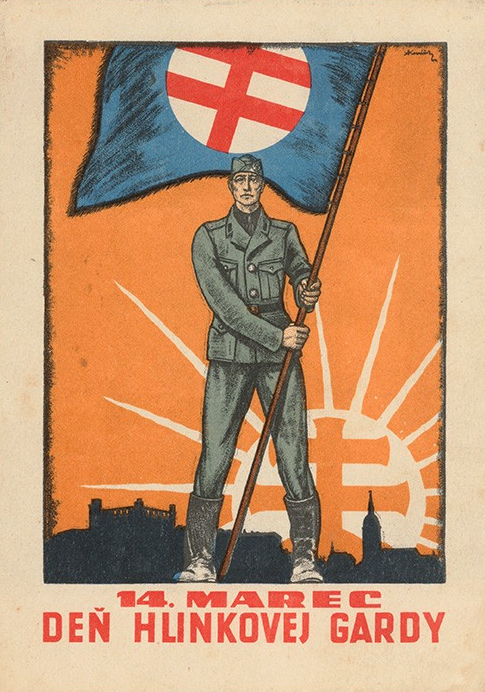
A Hlinka Guard propaganda poster, "March 14, Hlinka Guard Day", 1939

The Hlinka Guard (Slovak: Hlinkova garda; German: Hlinka-Garde; abbreviated as HG) was the militia maintained by the Slovak People's Party in the period from 1938 to 1945; it was named after Andrej Hlinka.

Variant flag of the Hlinka Guard

The Hlinka Guard was preceded by the Rodobrana (Home Defense/Nation's Defense) organization, which existed from 1923 to 1927 when the Czechoslovak authorities ordered its dissolution. During the crisis caused by Hitler's demand for the Sudetenland (in the summer of 1938), the Hlinka Guard emerged spontaneously, and on October 8 of that year, a week after Hitler's demand had been accepted at the Munich conference, the guard was officially set up, with Karol Sidor (1901–1953) as its first commander.

The Hlinka Guard was known for its participation in the Holocaust in Slovakia; its members appropriated Jewish property and rounded up Jews for deportation in 1942. In the post-war, under one of the Beneš decrees, No. 16/1945 Coll., membership in the Hlinka Guard was punishable by 5 to 20 years imprisonment.

== Duties ==
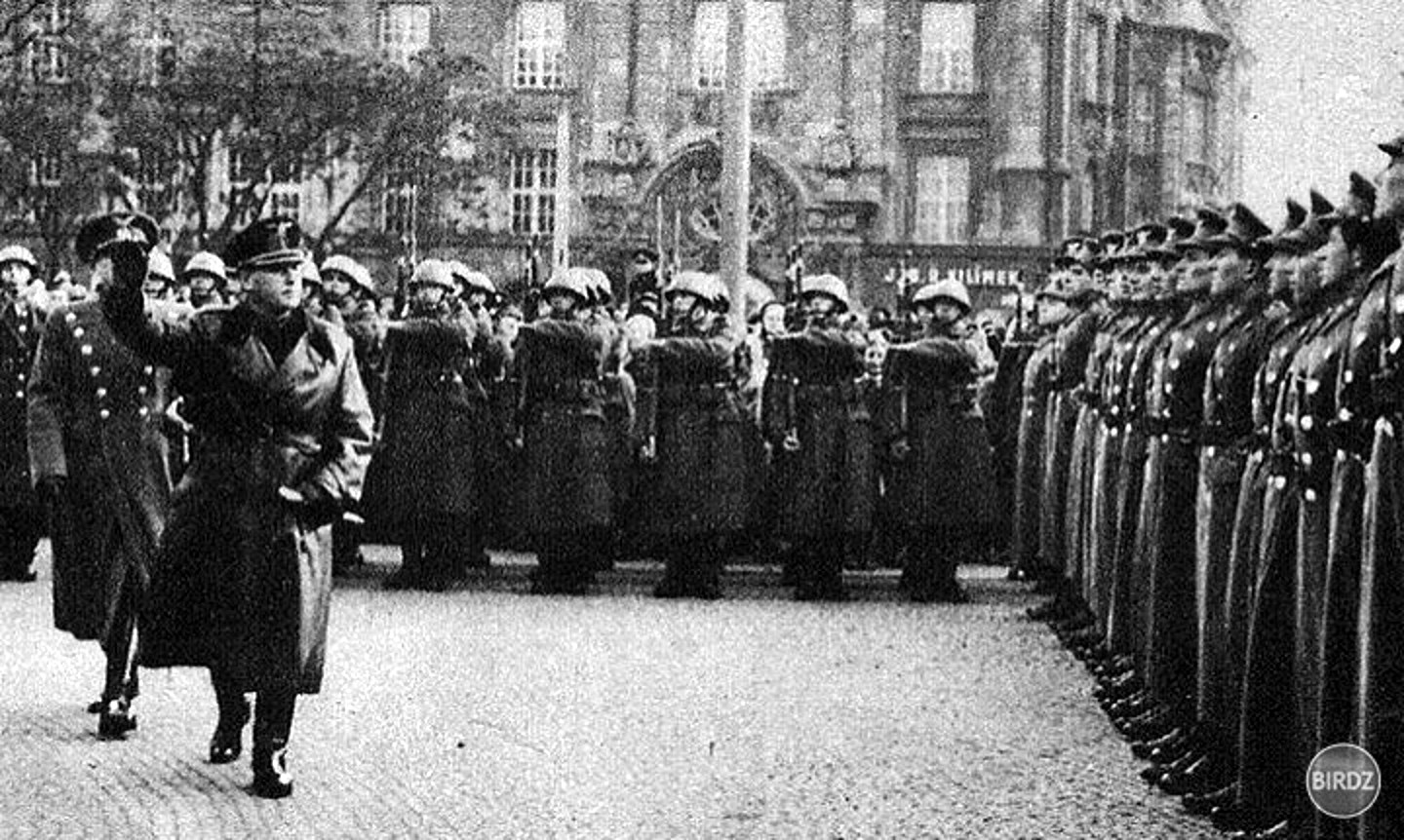
Hlinka Guard

The guard was the Hlinka party's military arm for internal security, and it continued in that role under the autonomous government of Slovakia in federated Czecho-Slovakia. The Hlinka Guard was Slovakia's state police and most willingly helped Hitler with his plans. It operated against Jews, Czechs, Hungarians, the Left, and the opposition. By a decree issued on October 29, 1938, the Hlinka Guard was designated as the only body authorized to give its members paramilitary training, and it was this decree that established its formal status in the country. Hlinka guardsmen wore black uniforms and a cap shaped like a boat, with a woolen pompom on top, and they used the raised-arm salute. The official salute was "Na stráž!" ("On guard!").

== Membership ==
Until March 14, 1939, when Slovakia declared its independence, the Hlinka Guard attracted recruits from all walks of life. On the following day, March 15, Alexander Mach became its commander, retaining the post up to the collapse of the pro-Nazi regime in Slovakia in 1945. Its functions were laid down in a series of government decrees: it was to be a paramilitary organization attached to the party, fostering nationalism, providing paramilitary training, and safeguarding internal security. By assuming these tasks, the guard was meant to counterbalance the army and the police. In 1941, Hlinka Guard shock troops were trained in SS camps in Germany, and the SS attached an adviser to the guard. At this point, many of the guardsmen who were of middle-class origin quit, and thenceforth, the organization consisted of peasants and unskilled laborers, together with various doubtful elements. A social message was integral to the radical nationalism that it sought to impart.

== Deportation of the Jews ==
In November 1938, the Hlinka Guard participated in the deportation of thousands of Jews. In 1942, the guard was involved in the deportation of almost 60,000 Slovak Jews to occupied Poland. The victims were given only four hours' warning to prevent them from escaping. Beatings and forcible shaving were commonplace, as was subjecting Jews to invasive searches to uncover hidden valuables. Some guards took advantage of their power to rape Jewish women.

== Political competition ==
A small group called Náš Boj (Our Struggle), which operated under SS auspices, was the most radical element in the guard. Throughout its existence, the Hlinka Guard competed with the Hlinka party for primacy in ruling the country. After the anti-Nazi Slovak National Uprising was crushed in August 1944, the SS took over and shaped the Hlinka Guard to suit its purposes. Special units of the guard (Hlinka Guard Emergency Divisions – POHG) were employed against partisans and Jews.

== Legacy ==
In the 2010s, the Hlinka Guard's uniforms reappeared in Slovakia as the preferred dress of far-right politician Marian Kotleba and his Our Slovakia party. Kotleba's group made minor alterations to the uniforms, as wearing the original uniforms remains illegal in Slovakia.

== See also ==
- Military ranks of Slovakia (1939–1945)
