= Ján Vojtaššák =

Slovak bishop and Nazi collaborator (1877-1965)

His Excellency Ján Vojtaššák
- Bishop of Spiš
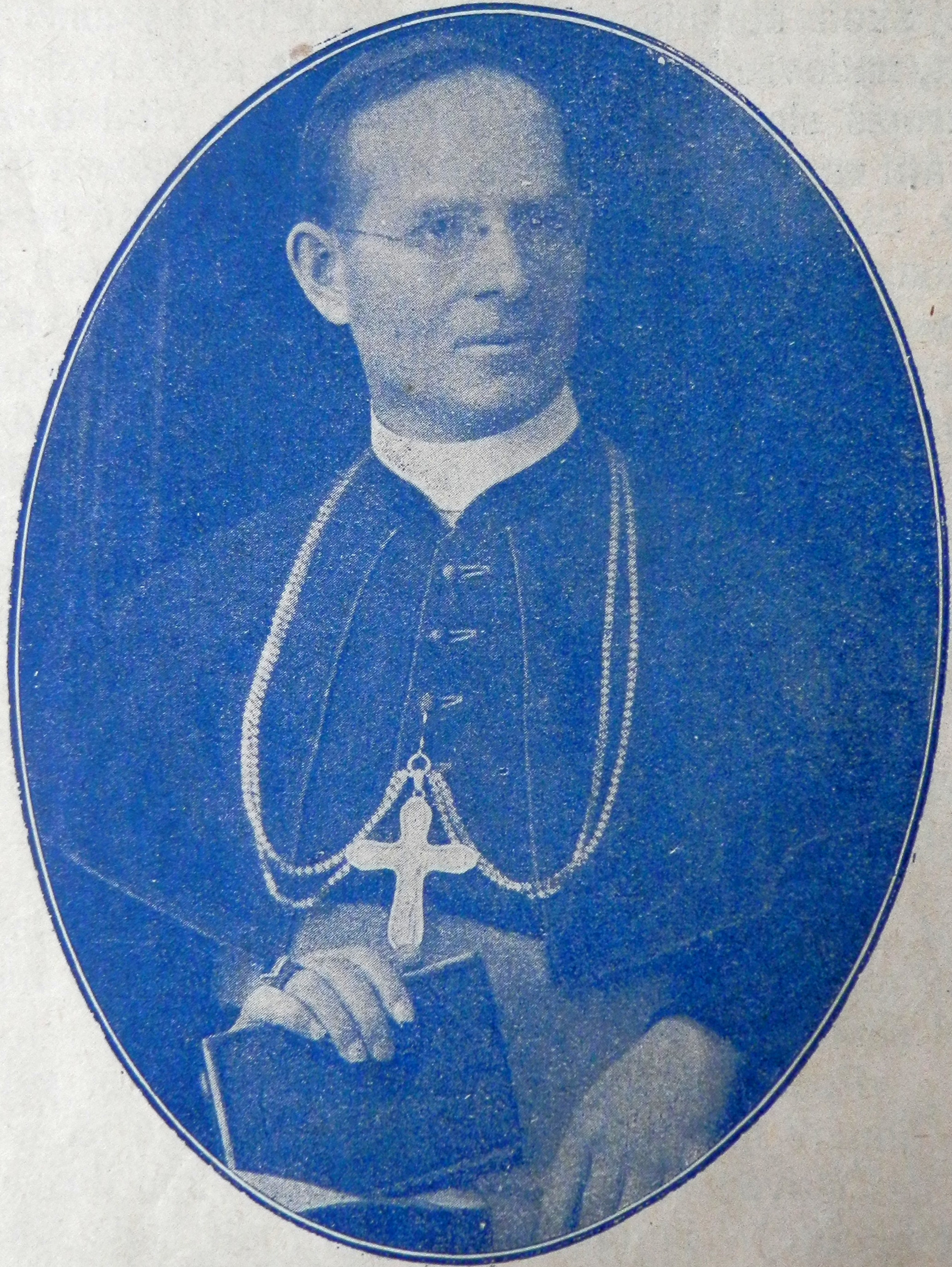
- Vojtaššák in 1942
- Church: Roman Catholic
- Appointed: 16 December 1920
- Predecessor: Alexander Párvy
- Successor: Sede vacante until 1989, František Tondra

Orders
- Ordination: 1 July 1901
- Consecration: 13 February 1921 by Clemente Micara

Personal details
- Born: 14 November 1877 Zákamenné, Austria-Hungary
- Died: 4 August 1965 (aged 87) Říčany, Czechoslovakia
- Education: Comenius University
- Motto: Angelis mandavit de te (Latin for 'His angels are sent to guard you')
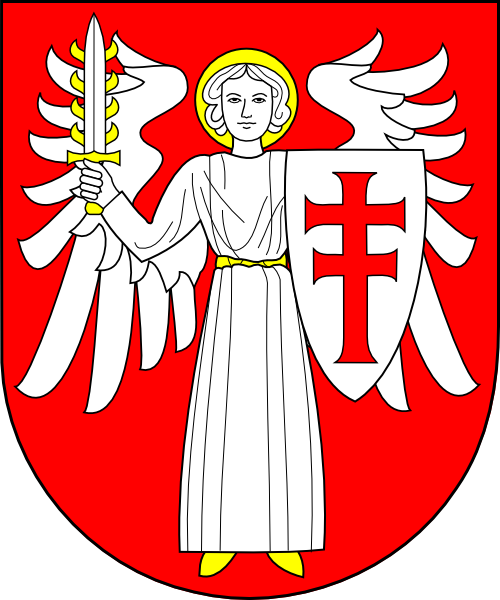
- Coat of arms

Ján Vojtaššák (14 November 1877 – 4 August 1965) was a Roman Catholic bishop of the Diocese of Spiš. He was imprisoned by the communist regime in Czechoslovakia in 1951. A case for his beatification is ongoing but has attracted opposition due to his complicity in the Holocaust in Slovakia.

== Early life ==
Ján Vojtaššák was born in 1877 in Zákamenné. He was ordained a bishop, alongside Karol Kmeťko and Marián Blaha, in 1921. Vojtaššák considered Andrej Hlinka his role model.

== Slovak State ==
Vojtaššák was the official Catholic representative to the Slovak Diet during the Axis Slovak State regime and also served as Deputy Chairman of the parliament. Vojtaššák personally signed documents for his diocese to take over the Baldovce spa from its original Jewish owners. When the deportation of Jews from Slovakia to Poland was discussed in March 1942, Vojtaššák did not oppose the deportation but merely asked that Jews who had converted to Christianity be settled separately from those who continued to practice Judaism. On 15 May, parliament approved Decree 68/1942, which retroactively legalized the deportation of Jews (which had begun in March), authorized the removal of their citizenship, and regulated exemptions. Vojtaššák, who was at the time Deputy Chairman, spoke during that debate without opposing the deportation.

Vatican diplomat Giuseppe Burzio wrote to Cardinal Luigi Maglione that Vojtaššák had reportedly said in a private meeting that the Church should not interfere in the Slovak State's persecution of the Jews because they were Slovakia's greatest enemies. Burzio wrote that Vojtaššák had a reputation for excessive nationalism and that he should not be expected to be sympathetic to Jews.

The Slovak historian Ivan Kamenec is critical of Vojtaššák's behavior during the war, arguing that he effectively approved of the deportations and only criticized inhuman actions against Jews who converted to Christianity. Likewise, historian Jan Pešek said that Vojtaššák "supported the deportation of Jews from Slovakia because he considered them a 'foreign element on the body of the Slovak nation'", although Vojtaššák changed his mind after learning about the extermination camps. Pešek said that Vojtaššák's antisemitic attitudes can be explained by the fact he never traveled abroad and that in rural Slovakia many people believed that Jews were the enemy.

== Anti-communism ==
On 5 May 1945, he was arrested, eventually being released in November 1945, at which point he returned to his native Spiš region. There, he was very active in the life of the Catholic Church. After the communist coup d'état in February 1948, he actively spoke against the communist regime closing down religious schools in the country. He refused to allow any Communist interference in the Church whatsoever. In 1949 Vojtaššák was put under surveillance by the StB (State Security). In September 1950 he was arrested and transferred to a holding cell of Ruzyně Prison in Prague. There he was violently interrogated until the end of the year. Despite the harsh interrogations and his age (73 years), he refused to sign a forced confession.

In January 1951 Vojtaššák alongside two other Slovak bishops were tried in Bratislava court. The show trial resulted in a prison sentence of 24 years for treason, espionage and other charges. He was imprisoned in Valdice Prison, then Leopoldov Prison, and eventually in June 1956 in Pankrác Prison. During his imprisonment Vojtaššák was beaten and tortured, which took a toll on his health. Based on that, his sentence was temporarily suspended, and he was placed in a de facto house arrest in Děčín. In April 1959 he was arrested again for allegedly organizing a plot of Spiš priests. Vojtaššák was interrogated in several places, eventually landing again in Pankrác and Valdice prisons. His health was deteriorating further. In October 1963 he was released following the presidential amnesty for some political prisoners. Vojtaššák wanted to return to Slovakia but the government ordered him a permanent residency in a retirement house for priests in Senohraby near Prague, where he lived until his death two years later.

== Proposed beatification ==
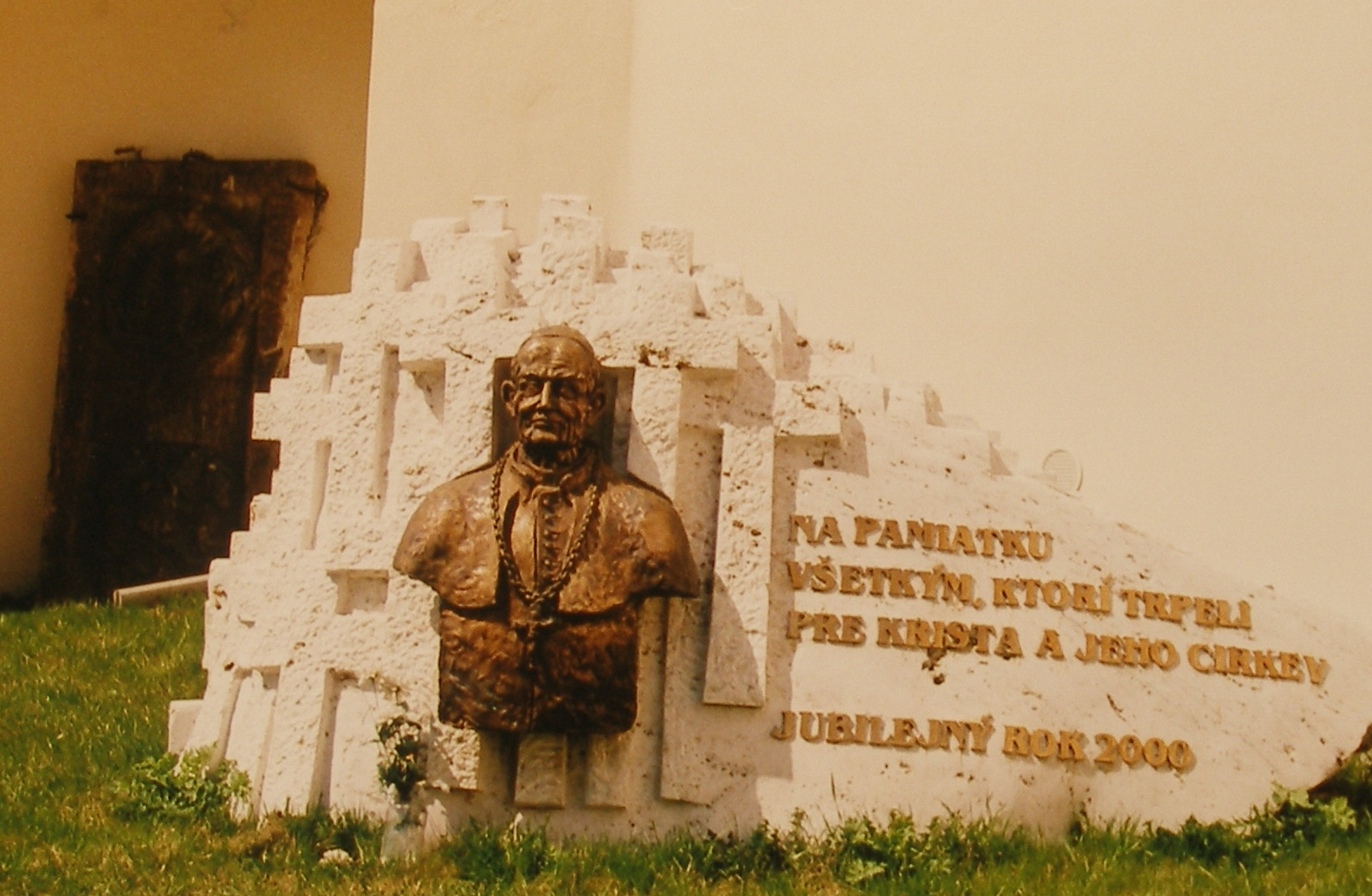
Memorial to Vojtaššák in Spišská Kapitula

In 1995, Pope John Paul II suggested that Vojtaššák should be canonized, which was opposed by Slovak and Israeli historians and the Jewish community. The historians presented evidence of his involvement in the Holocaust in an open letter to the Vatican. Jaroslav Franek, the president of the Central Union of Jewish Religious Communities in the Slovak Republic, said "Bishop Vojtaššák failed morally both as a person and a politician". Vojtaššák was also supported by Slovak clergy including František Tondra, president of the Slovak Bishops' Conference, who has lobbied for Vojtaššák's canonization. The beatification process was halted due to the opposition. The case for his beatification was restarted and is ongoing as of 2019.
