= Presidential exemption (Slovak State) =

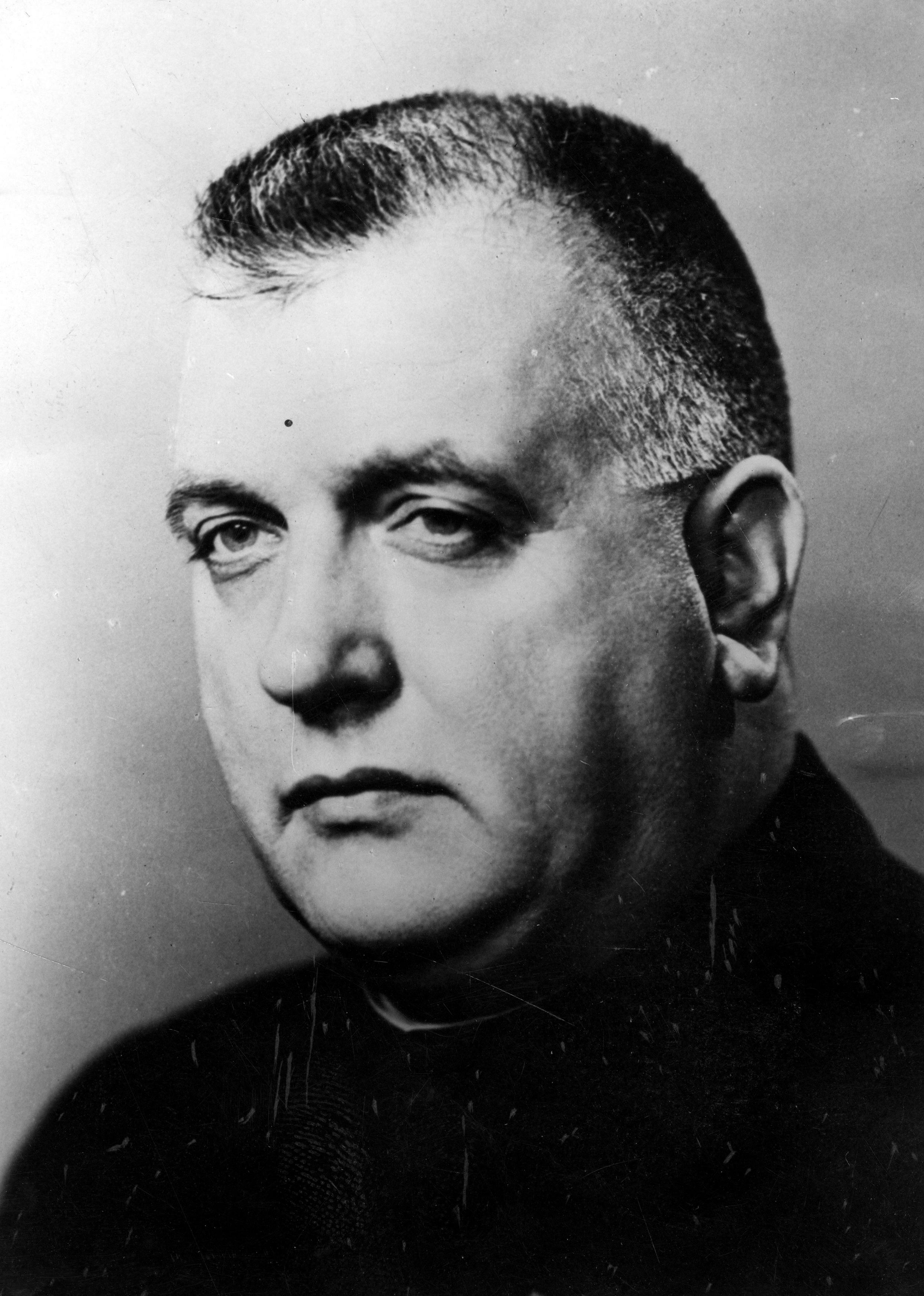
Jozef Tiso, c. 1936

Presidential exemptions (Slovak: prezidentské výnimky, singular prezidentská výnimka) were granted by President of the Slovak State Jozef Tiso to individual Jews, exempting them from systematic persecution through anti-Jewish legislation introduced by Tiso's Jewish Code (patterned on the Nazi Nuremberg Laws) during the Holocaust. The exemptions were exchanged for arbitrary monetary fees. From an estimated 20,000 requests, 600 documented exemptions covering 1,000 people were granted, but only after 1942, when deportations to Auschwitz death camp had already stopped. Following the German invasion of 1944, when deportations resumed, all exemptions were nullified.

Assessing the true humanitarian value of the exemptions is difficult. They could be revoked at any moment, and some were overlooked by the Slovak authorities after being paid for. A vast majority of them were granted to pre-1939 Christian converts only defined as racially Jewish, with only 6% granted to people actively practising the Jewish faith. 40% were in married relationships with "Aryans". Many were granted to highly trained professionals such as doctors who were valuable to the Slovak war effort.

Meanwhile, there is clear documentation that between 68,000 and 71,000 of Slovak Jews, about 80% of the pre-war population, were murdered. Only 19,000 Jews were even left alive in Slovakia when the exemptions started. The exemptions are at the center of a historical and political debate in modern Slovakia. Some groups, in particular the fringes of Slovak nationalism, wish to put the exemptions forward as evidence that Tiso and his regime wished to protect Jews, and have claimed that up to 35,000 Jews were saved. Their claims have been challenged by Holocaust historians, who note the lack of documented evidence for more than 600 exemptions, or 1% of the Jewish population, pointing to a seeming reliance on exaggerated estimates.

== Background ==
In March 1939, the Slovak State declared independence from Czechoslovakia; Germany invaded the Czech rump state. That October, Jozef Tiso, a Catholic priest, became president of Slovakia. The new state immediately began to implement anti-Jewish measures aimed at removing Jews from the economy. In order to systematize antisemitic legislation, Slovak legislators passed the Jewish Code, 270 anti-Jewish articles largely focused at removing Jews from the economy, on 9 September 1941. Based on the Nuremberg Laws, the Code defined Jews in terms of their ancestry, banned intermarriage, and required that all Jews older than six wear a yellow armband. The Jewish Code excluded Jews from public life, forbidding them from traveling at certain times, using radios or phones, shopping at certain hours, or belonging to any clubs or organizations. Slovak propaganda asserted that the Jewish Code was the strictest set of anti-Jewish laws in Europe. However, the legislation also granted the president had the ability to exempt any Jew from the law.

== Exemptions ==
After the passing of the Jewish Code, Tiso was "bombarded" by petitions from Jews asking to be exempted from the anti-Jewish legislation. These requests increased during the deportation of Slovakia's Jews in 1942, and eventually totaled 20,000. He was permitted to charge anywhere from 1,000 to 500,000 Slovak koruna (Ks) as an administrative fee and revoke exemptions at will. Each exemption protected the holder and his or her immediate family.

Of the racially defined Jews granted exemptions, only 6% were of the Jewish faith and most had been baptized before 1939. At least 38% were in mixed marriages with "Aryans". Slovak historian Martina Fiamová wrote that Tiso only granted exemptions to “morally and politically reliable” Jews who contributed to Catholic causes. The exemption holders were also disproportionately well-educated and many had professional careers useful to the Slovak State. For example, of 125 requests from Jewish doctors, 80 were granted.

After the war, Tiso said that he had routinely charged 10,000-15,000 Ks for exemptions. According to American historian James Mace Ward, the process he used to grant the exemption "for the most part he only granted exemptions to Jews who were assimilated and Christian, in addition to economically useful.

Even when it was granted, the presidential exemption did not guarantee protection, and local authorities sometimes deported exemption holders. Many Jews were deported before their request for exemption could be considered or issued. At the end of the deportations, 18,945 Jews were legally present in Slovakia, of whom 1,000 were protected by presidential exemptions. Three-quarters of these were in no danger of deportation, according to Ward's study.

The majority of the exemptions were issued in 1943, after the deportations were over, and covered as many as 6,000 people, according to Ivan Kamenec's research. However, although these exemptions spared the holder from the requirements of the Jewish Code, such as having to wear a yellow badge, they did not save anyone's life. The exemptions were not honored after the German invasion of Slovakia in August 1944, after which about half of the remaining Jews were deported and murdered. Angry that some exemption holders had joined the partisans, Tiso cancelled many of them.

== Legacy ==
According to Ward, the exemption allowed Tiso to present himself as a savior of Jews without making significant concessions in the antisemitic policies of the regime, therefore maintaining his Christian legitimacy without alienating his Nazi backers. The presidential exemption is the basis of claims by Milan Stanislav Ďurica and Slovak ultranationalists that Tiso saved as many as 35,000 Jews from his regime's own antisemitic policies. These politically motivated statements aim to rehabilitate the reputation of Tiso and the Slovak State.

However, this campaign had little relevance to the majority of Slovaks, and, according to a 2005 opinion poll, only 5% of Slovaks viewed Tiso "very favorably". Ward notes that the evidence for the number of exemptions issued is "straightforward and indisputable". A controversial textbook written by Ďurica which presented Tiso and his colleagues as "saviours of the Jewish population" was harshly criticized by historians and later retracted.
