= Historiography of the Holocaust in Slovakia =

The historiography of the Holocaust in Slovakia has been a much-debated subject, and historians have still not arrived at a consensus position as to the role of the Slovak State in the Holocaust.

During the Communist era, scholars were required to analyze events through a Marxist historiographical framework. Marxist historiography viewed Aryanization was a struggle between Jewish and Christian owners, and wealthy Slovaks encouraged the working class to adopt antisemitic beliefs in order to divide the proletariat. However, responsibility for the Holocaust was placed squarely on Nazi Germany. During the Prague Spring era, Ivan Kamenec's dissertation on the Holocaust in Slovakia was accepted, and Kamenec was allowed to publish four studies from it. He was not allowed to publish the dissertation because it was accused of being non-Marxist and promoting Zionism. Academic inquiry again became impossible during the period of normalization that followed.

As a result, the first studies of the Holocaust were published outside the country, for example The Destruction of Slovak Jewry (1961) by Livia Rothkirchen in Hebrew and Die Juden im slowakischen Staat, 1939–1945 (The Jews in the Slovak State) by Ladislav Lipscher in 1980.

Another strand of historiography was developed by anti-Communists living in exile.

Later, perestroika allowed the emergence of more balanced accounts in Slovakia.
