= Milan Stanislav Ďurica =

Slovak historian and theologian (1925–2024)

- Born: 13 August 1925; Krivany, Czechoslovakia
- Died: 25 January 2024 (aged 98); Bratislava, Slovakia
- Education: University of Padua
- Known for: Dejiny Slovenska a Slovákov (History of Slovakia and the Slovaks); Jozef Tiso (1887–1947), Životopisný profil (Jozef Tiso (1887–1947), a biographical profile)
- Scientific career
- Fields: History of Slovakia; Theology; Slovak language Italian literature
- Workplaces: Salesian Theological College, Abano Terme; University of Padua; Comenius University

Milan Stanislav Ďurica (13 August 1925 – 25 January 2024) was a Slovak historian, Salesian priest and Catholic theologian.

== Biography ==
Milan Stanislav Ďurica was born in Krivany, Czechoslovakia (now Slovakia) on 13 August 1925.

=== Church career ===
Ďurica became a member of the Salesian order on 14 August 1944 and became ordained a priest on 1 July 1956. As a theologian, Pope John XXIII appointed him as adviser of the Preparatory Commission of Second Vatican Council.

=== Academic career ===
Ďurica began his academic career in 1956, as professor of Theology at the Salesian Theological College in Abano Terme. He achieved a Ph.D. in Political Science in 1961 at University of Padua. In 1967 he became professor of political and constitutional history of Eastern European countries at the same university, where he was also Slovak language lecturer. In 1969 he founded the Eastern European Studies Centre (Centro di Studi sull'Europa Orientale) in Padua. He founded and edited Il Mondo Slavo, the yearbook of the Institute of Slavic Philology at the University of Padua.

From 1993 Ďurica served as professor of church history at the Cyril and Methodius Theological Faculty of the Comenius University in Bratislava. He retired from teaching in 1997.

As a historian, Ďurica mainly concentrated on modern history of Slovakia and on the history of First Slovak Republic. His most successful book, Dejiny Slovenska a Slovákov (History of Slovakia and the Slovaks), remains controversial among Slovak historians and politicians, although it is the best-seller of Slovak history books. Indeed, despite some appreciation for his work on documents from Italian archives, not accessible to other Czechoslovak historians during the communist regime, he was criticised as an "ultranationalist".

Bibliography of Ďurica's works represents 1,700 publications, issued in eight languages. For its scientific and cultural activity he was made Grand Officer of the Order of Merit of the Italian Republic in 1995. The Accademia Teatina per le Scienze in Rome awarded him the title of Honorary Academician. In 1991 the Minister of Culture of Slovakia Ivan Hudec appointed him as the first director of the Slovak Historical Institute in Rome (the institute was later closed and re-founded in 2001).

Ďurica also contributed to the first translation into Slovak language of Dante Alighieri, Francesco Petrarca and Ugo Foscolo.

== Death ==
Ďurica died in Bratislava on 25 January 2024, at the age of 98.

== Reception ==
Ďurica was criticized for his attempts to rehabilitate the wartime Slovak State and its president, Jozef Tiso, whose actions resulted in the deaths of some 70,000 Jews during the Holocaust in Slovakia. Ďurica claimed that Tiso used the power of presidential exemption for Jews to save 35,000 Jews from his regime's own antisemitic policies. According to American historian James Mace Ward and other scholars, evidence for the number of exemptions issued is "straightforward and indisputable": only about 650 exemptions covering 1,000 Jews were issued prior to the end of deportations in 1942, and three-quarters of these Jews were covered by other exemptions. A controversial textbook written by Ďurica presented Tiso and his colleagues as "saviours of the Jewish population" and implied that Jews drafted for forced labour had it better than the non-Jewish Slovak population. The textbook was harshly criticized by historians and later retracted.

== Bibliography ==
- Dr. Jozef Tiso and the Jewish Problem in Slovakia, 1957
- La Slovacchia a le sue relazioni politiche con la Germania 1938 - 1945. Vol I., Padova, 1964
- Die Slowakei in der Märzkrise 1939, 1964
- Cultural Relations Between Slovakia and Italy in Modern Times, Toronto 1978
- La lingua slovaca. Profilo storico-filologico guida bibliografica, Padova 1983
- Dr. Jozef Kirschbaum und seine politische Tätigkeit im Lichte der Geheimdokumente des Dritten Reiches, München 1988
- La Slovaquie et ses efforts vers l’independance (de 1848 a 1938), In: Slovak Studies 28–29, Bratislava 1988
- Christliches Kulturlebe als historische Konstante der ethnischen Identität der Slowaken, In: Slowakei 26, Bratislava 1989
- Die nationale Identität und ihr historischer Umriss in der slowakischen Wirklichkeit, In: Slowakei 26, Bratislava 1989
- Slovenský národ a jeho štátnosť, Bratislava 1990
- Recepcia F. Petrarcu v slovenskej kultúre, Bratislava 1991
- A Historical Projection of the Heritage of Cyril and Methodius in the Slovak Culture, In: Slovak Review 1, Bratislava 1992
- Andrej Hlinka priekopník sociálnej starostlivosti a demokratických práv slovenského ľudu, Bratislava 1994
- Dejiny Slovenska a Slovákov, Slovenské pedagogické nakladateľstvo, Bratislava 1995
- K otázke počiatkov slovenských dejín, Martin 1995
- Priblížiť sa k pravde, Bratislava 1997
- Milan Rastislav Štefánik vo svetle talianskych dokumentov, THB, 1998
- Slovenská republika 1939-1945, Bratislava 1999, ISBN 80-7114-262-X.
- Jozef Tiso (1887-1947), Životopisný profil, Bratislava 2006, ISBN 80-7114-572-6.
- Kedy sme vstúpili do dejín? K otázke začiatkov slovenských dejín, Bratislava 2006, ISBN 80-7114-565-3.
- Odkedy sme Slováci? Pôvod Slovákov a kresťanstvo, Bratislava 2006, ISBN 80-7114-485-1.
- Nacionalizmus alebo národné povedomie? Bratislava 2006, ISBN 80-7114-566-1.
- Dejiny Slovenska a Slovákov v časovej následnosti faktov dvoch tisícročí, Bratislava 2007
- Slovenská republika a jej vzťah k Svätej stolici (1939-1945), Bratislava 2007, ISBN 978-80-7114-651-3.
- Priblížiť sa k pravde. Kritický pohľad na Stanovisko Historického ústavu SAV k mojej knihe Dejiny Slovenska a Slovákov, Bratislava 2007, ISBN 978-80-7114-606-3.
- Jozef Tiso v očiach neslovenských autorov, Bratislava 2007, ISBN 978-80-7114-608-7.
- Slobodní murári, Bratislava 2007, ISBN 978-80-7114-652-0.
- Moravskí Slováci. Cyrilo-metodovské dedictvo, Bratislava 2007, ISBN 978-80-7114-607-0.
- Tomáš G. Masaryk a jeho vzťah k Slovákom, Bratislava 2007, ISBN 978-80-7114-653-7.
- Edvard Beneš a jeho vzťah k Slovákom, Bratislava 2008, ISBN 978-80-7114-668-1.
- Jozef Tiso a Židia, Bratislava 2008, ISBN 978-80-7114-701-5.
- Vzťahy medzi Slovákmi a Čechmi, Bratislava 2008, ISBN 978-80-7114-699-5.
- Slováci a Sedembolestná. Kultúrno-historický náčrt, Bratislava 2008, ISBN 978-80-7114-700-8.
- Čo ohrozuje našu štátnosť. K 15. výročiu Slovenskej republiky, Bratislava 2008, ISBN 978-80-7114-667-4.
- Židia zo Slovenska v dejinách kultúry a vedy, Bratislava 2008, ISBN 978-80-7114-669-8.
- Slovenský národný odpor proti nacizmu, Bratislava 2009, ISBN 978-80-7114-726-8.
- Slovenské dejiny a ich historiografia, Bratislava 2009, ISBN 978-80-7114-784-8.
- Národná identita a jej historický profil v slovenskej spoločnosti, Bratislava 2010, ISBN 978-80-7114-802-9.
- Ohrozenia kresťanstva v súčasnej politickej situácii, Bratislava 2010, ISBN 978-80-7114-827-2.
- Z rozhrania svetov. Výber z básnickej tvorby, Bratislava 2010, ISBN 978-80-7114-826-5.
- Ferdinand Ďurčanský a jeho vzťah k Hitlerovmu Nemecku, Bratislava 2011, ISBN 978-80-7114-859-3.

== External links and sources ==
- Milan Stanislav Ďurica, www.osobnosti.sk
- I. Kamenec, Spor o Ďuricovu knihu (Dilema, okt. 1997, str. 23–26)
- Interview with Milan S. Ďurica, (Don Bosco dnes, č. 2, 2001, s. 21–23)
