= Ján Spišiak =

Slovak lawyer (1901–1981)

Ján Spišiak (12 January 1901 – 14 November 1981) was a Slovak lawyer who specialized in business law, who worked for much of his career as the legal representative of Tatra banka. However, he is best known for his role as the Slovak ambassador to Hungary during the Second World War.

== Early life ==
Spišiak was born on 12 January 1901 in České Brezovo. He graduated from the Charles University in Prague faculty of law. From 1 April 1929, he worked as the legal representative of Tatra banka.

== Ambassador to Hungary ==
From 1 January 1940 to 1 October 1944, he was the Slovak ambassador to Hungary, for which he received no remuneration. In November 1939 at a meeting in Budapest, he told the United States ambassador that Slovakia enjoyed considerable independence under German protection. Spišiak believed that a German victory would be disastrous for its allies in southeastern Europe, but he did not think that it was a likely outcome. In early 1941 in a meeting with Soviet diplomat Nikolai Sharonov, he predicted the German invasion of the Soviet Union before it occurred, but said that Slovakia preferred friendly relations between Moscow and Budapest.

Following the German invasion of Hungary in March 1944, he issued letters of protection to 3,000 Slovak Jews who had fled to Hungary in 1942, allowing them to legally cross the border and return home. Spišiak also helped Poles in Hungary by providing them with false Slovak papers enabling them to enter Slovakia.

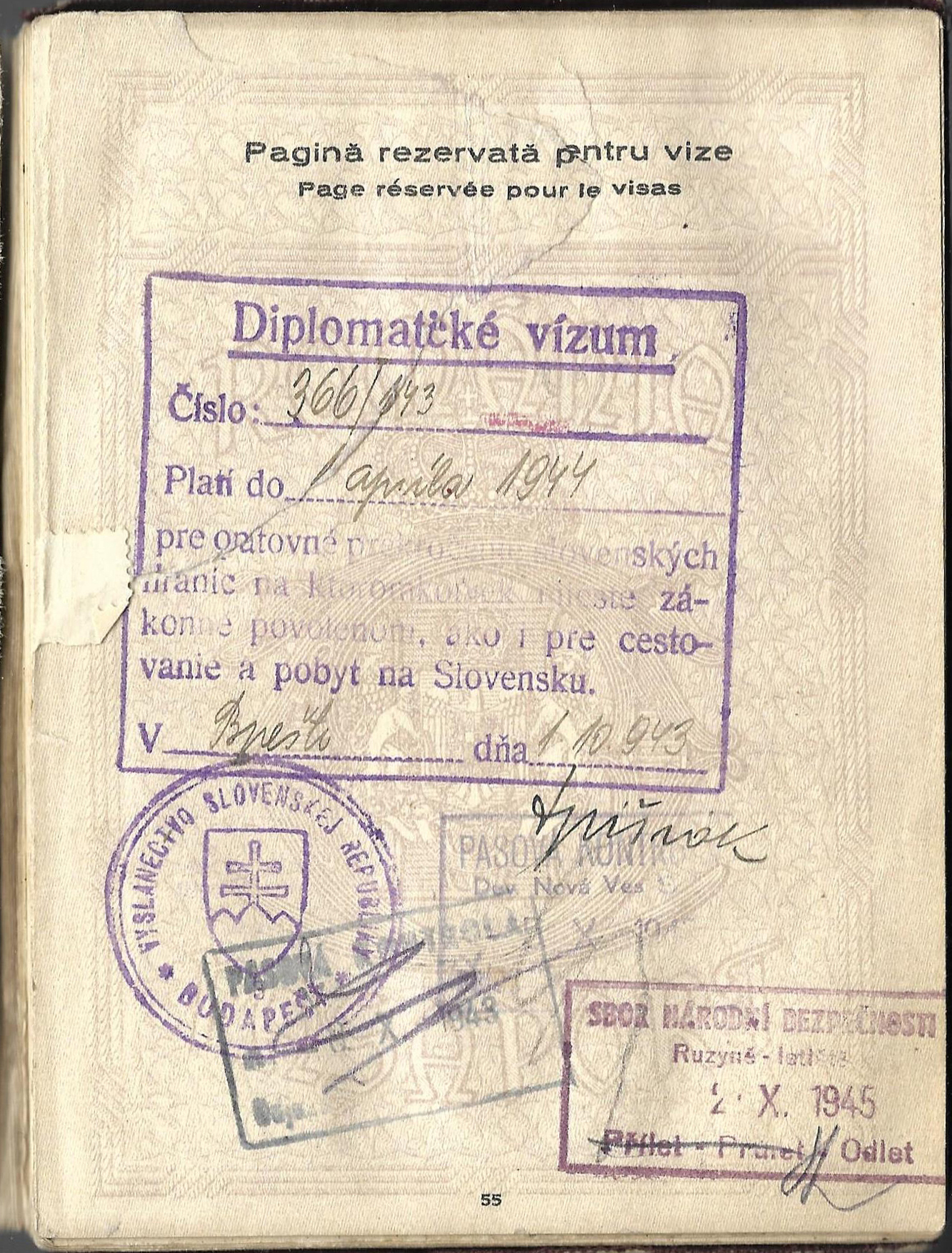
Ján Spišiak signed diplomatic visa as ambassador to Budapest, 1943.

== After the war ==
After the Siege of Budapest ended in a Soviet victory, he was arrested by SMERSH on 8 February 1945 and deported to Moscow. Following his arrest, he claimed that he had been working for the Czechoslovak government-in-exile throughout the war. He was allowed to return to Czechoslovakia in order to give evidence against the leadership of the wartime Slovak State. A criminal case was opened against him in 1947 but dropped later that year, as a result of his testimony against the Slovak State government and a recommendation by the Slovak resistance movement.

Spišiak returned to his position at Tatra banka and also lectured at Comenius University, while writing books on business law. He helped to organize the merger of Tatra banka into Slovenská banka and later into Štátna banka československá. Following his retirement in 1961 (even though he would have preferred to keep working), Spišiak lived on a pension until his death in Bratislava on 14 November 1981.

Spišiak's memoir, Spomienky z Budapešti 1939 - 1944 (Memories of Budapest 1939–1944) was published by Slovak Academic Press in 2010.
