= Krivany =

- Municipality
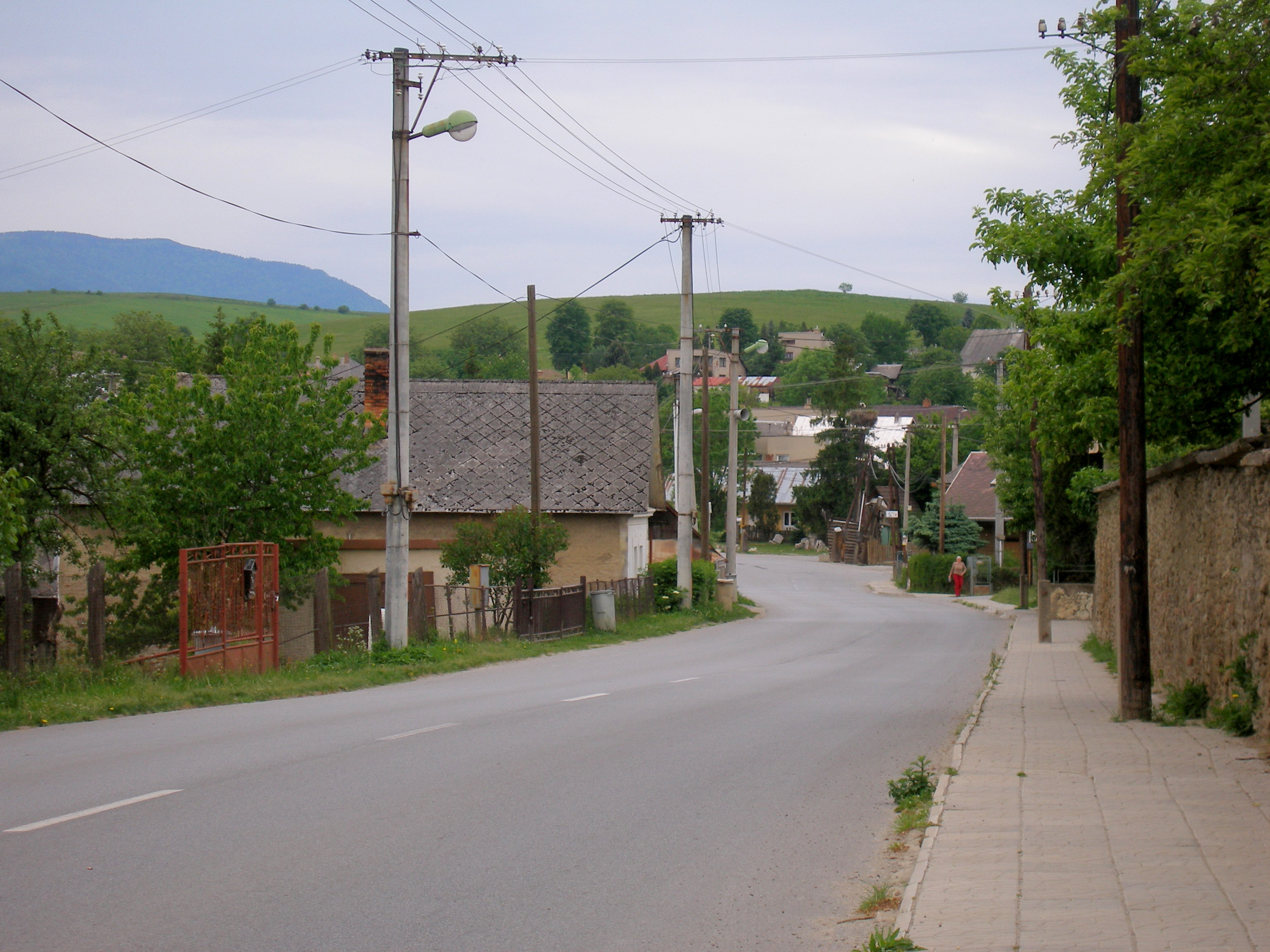

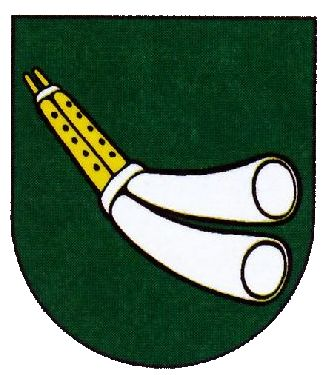
- Flag Coat of arms

- Location of Krivany in the Prešov Region Location of Krivany in Slovakia
- Coordinates: 49.17°N 20.92°E
- Country: Slovakia
- Region: Prešov Region
- District: Sabinov District
- First mentioned: 1301

Area
  - Total: 18.86 km^{2} (7.28 sq mi)
- Elevation: 415 m (1,362 ft)

Population (2025)
  - Total: 1,293
- Time zone: UTC+1 (CET)
  - Summer (DST): UTC+2 (CEST)
- Postal code: 827 1
- Area code: +421 51
- Vehicle registration plate (until 2022): SB
- Website: www.obeckrivany.sk

Krivany is a village and municipality in Sabinov District in the Prešov Region of north-eastern Slovakia.

== History ==
In historical records the village was first mentioned in 1301.

== Geography ==
The municipality lies at an altitude of 415 metres (1,362 ft) and covers an area of 18.86 km^{2} (7.28 sq mi) (2025).

== Population ==
Population statistic (10 years)
Year	1995	2005	2015	2025
Count	1062	1139	1228	1293
Difference		+7.25%	+7.81%	+5.29%

Population statistic
Year	2024	2025
Count	1281	1293
Difference		+0.93%

It has a population of 1293 people (31 December 2025).

=== Ethnic composition ===
Census 2021 (1+ %)
Ethnicity	Number	Fraction
Slovak	960	79.66%
Romani	218	18.09%
Not found out	39	3.23%
Rusyn	15	1.24%
Total	1205	

In year 2021 was 1205 people by ethnicity 960 as Slovak, 218 as Romani, 39 as Not found out, 15 as Rusyn, 3 as Other, 2 as Czech, 2 as Russian, 2 as English and 1 as French.

Note on population: The difference values of population numbers in the table "Population statistic" and in the sections "Ethnicity" & "Religion" is caused by the use of various statistical methods.

=== Religion ===
Census 2021 (1+ %)
Religion	Number	Fraction
Roman Catholic Church	1064	88.3%
None	52	4.32%
Greek Catholic Church	36	2.99%
Not found out	33	2.74%
Total	1205	

In year 2021 was 1205 people by religion 1064 from Roman Catholic Church, 52 from None, 36 from Greek Catholic Church, 33 from Not found out, 4 from Other and not ascertained christian church, 4 from Evangelical Church, 3 from Paganism and natural spirituality, 3 from Jehovah's Witnesses, 2 from Eastern Orthodox Church, 2 from Other, 1 from Old Catholic Church and 1 from Calvinist Church.
