= Tatra Banka =

Súkromná banka na Slovensku

Tatra banka, a.s.

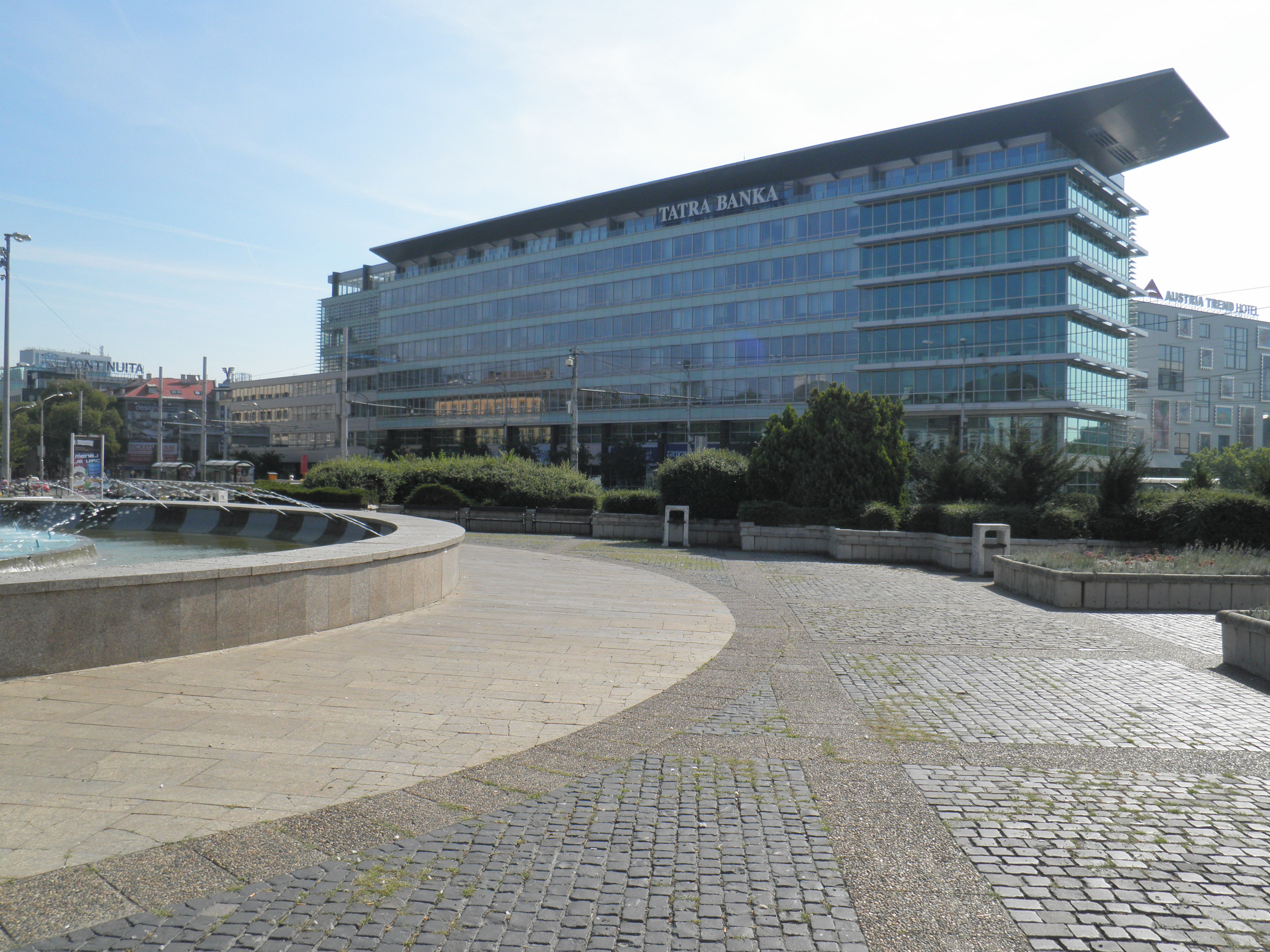
- Tatra banka headquarters in Bratislava
- Company type: Commercial bank
- Industry: Financial services
- Founded: 1990
- Headquarters: Bratislava, Slovakia
- Key people: Mgr. Michal Liday (CEO)
- Products: Banking, Asset management, Pension funds, Leasing
- Number of employees: About 3,500
- Website: www.tatrabanka.sk

Tatra banka is a commercial bank in Slovakia. It was founded in 1990 as the first private bank in Slovakia. It took the name of a former bank also named Tatra Banka (1885-1948), albeit not its residual assets and liabilities that had remained separately accounted for during the Communist period. It started financial operations in December 1991.

As of 1 January 2018, it had 106 branches, 16 commercial business centers and 3,500 employees. Tatra banka is a member of the Austrian Raiffeisen Bank International AG.

== Headquarters ==
- Tatra banka, a.s., Hodžovo námestie 3, 811 06 Bratislava, Slovakia

== Awards ==
- Bank of the Year, 2018: for the 14th year in a row, the British financial magazine Euromoney awarded Tatra banka the title of "Best Slovak Bank". The bank was also named "Best Bank" by Global Finance and EMEA Finance magazines.
- The bank's private banking service defended its leading position in Slovakia in 2018, when it received the "Best Private Bank" title from EMEA Finance.
- Global Finance magazine granted Tatra Banka the "Best Digital Bank in Slovakia" award.

== See also ==
- List of banks in Slovakia
