= Ivan Kamenec =

Slovak historian (born 1938)

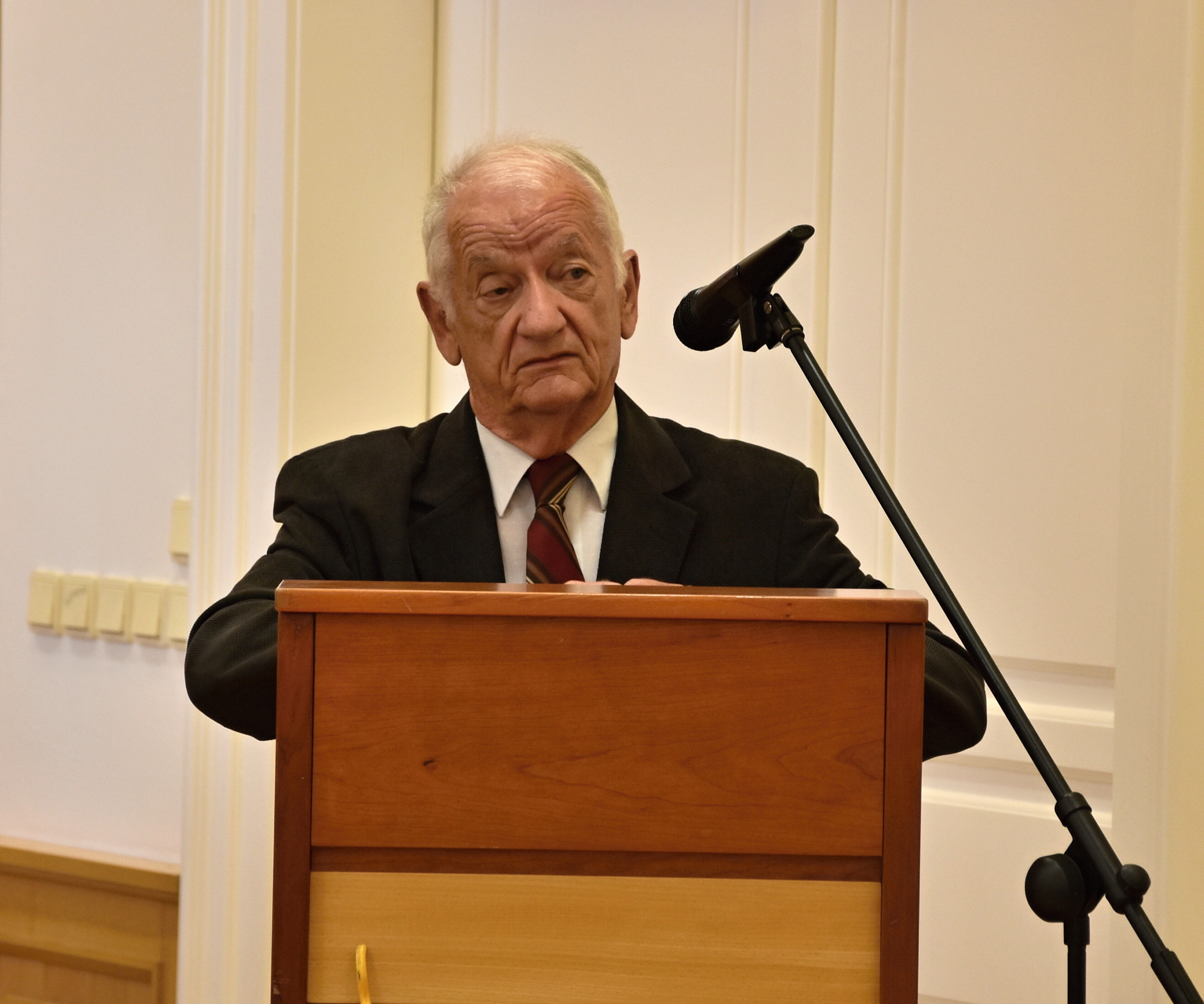
- Born: 27 August 1938 (age 88); Nitra, Czechoslovakia
- Citizenship: Slovakia
- Known for: Researching the Holocaust in Slovakia
- Awards: Order of Ľudovít Štúr, first class

Academic background
- Education: Comenius University

Academic work
- Institutions: Slovak National Museum; Slovak Academy of Sciences
- Notable works: On the Trail of Tragedy: the Holocaust in Slovakia

Ivan Kamenec (born 27 August 1938) is a Slovak historian.

== Life ==
Kamenec was born into a Jewish family in Nitra on 27 August 1938 and grew up in Janova Ves. His father, a civil engineer, managed to secure an economic exception to the 1942 deportations, during which most Slovak Jews were sent to the extermination camps. Kamenec avoided the resumption in anti-Jewish persecution during and after the Slovak National Uprising by hiding with his family in a bunker from September 1944 to April 1945, when Slovakia was liberated by the Red Army. He attended secondary school in Topoľčany. He graduated from Faculty of Philosophy of Comenius University in Bratislava in 1961. Then he worked at the State Slovak Central Archive in Bratislava and the Slovak National Museum in Bratislava. At present, he works at the Institute of History of Slovak Academy of Sciences. He is a chairman of Slovak section of common Czech-Slovak Commission of Historians and a member of the board of directors of Holocaust Documentation Center. The main theme of his scientific research is the political and cultural history of Slovakia in the 20th century. He deals especially with the history of the First Slovak Republic from the years 1939–1945, the political system and the political and cultural elites. He is a respected scholar in the area of the Holocaust in Slovakia and his work On the Trail of Tragedy belongs to basic works in this field. The work was written in the 1970s but was not published until 1991 because the topic was taboo in Czechoslovakia during the communistic era.

Some of Kamenec's critics have used his Jewish heritage to dismiss his academic work. Because of the controversial nature of his work, he has received death threats. However, Kamenec told The Slovak Spectator that he did not take it seriously because such individuals are not representative of Slovak society.

Kamenec was awarded the Order of Ľudovít Štúr, 1st Class, by the president of Slovakia in January 2017 for his contributions to the academic discipline of history and the promotion of human rights and democracy.

== Selected works ==
=== Monographs ===
- 1984 Začiatky marxistického historického myslenia na Slovensku. (Historizmus a jeho úloha v slovenskom revolučnom robotníckom hnutí.) [The Beginnings of Marxist Historical Thought in Slovakia. (Historicism and its Role in the Slovak Revolutionary Labor Movement)] (in Slovak).
- 1991 Po stopách tragédie [On the Trail of Tragedy] (in Slovak)
- 1992 Slovenský stát (1939–1945) [The Slovak State (1939-1945] (in Slovak)
- 1993 Trauma: Az első Szlovák Köztársaság (1939–1945) [Trauma: The Slovak State (1939–1945)] (in Hungarian, translation)
- 1998 Tragédia politika, kňaza a človeka. (Dr. Jozef Tiso 1887–1947.) [Tragedy of a Politician, a Priest and a Man (Dr. Jozef Tiso 1887–1947)] (in Slovak)
- 2000 Hľadanie a blúdenie v dejinách. Úvahy, štúdie a polemiky. [Searching and Wandering in History. Considerations, Studies and Controversies] (in Slovak)
- 2001 Tragedia polityka, księdza i człowieka. (Jozef Tiso 1887–1947.) [Tragedy of a Politician, a Priest and a Man (Dr. Jozef Tiso 1887–1947)] (in Polish, translation)
- 2007 On the Trail of Tragedy. The Holocaust in Slovakia (in English, translation).
- 2008 Slovenský štát v obrazoch (1939–1945) [The Slovak State in Pictures] (in Slovak)

=== Collective works and editions of documents ===
- 1988 Na spoločnej ceste [On the Common Journey] (in Slovak)
- 1985 Dejiny Slovenska. Vol. 5. (1918–1945) [History of Slovakia Vol. 5 (1918–1945)] (in Slovak)
- 1988 Dejiny Slovenska. Vol. 6. (1945–1960) [History of Slovakia Vol. 6 (1945–1960)] (in Slovak)
- 1992 Politické strany na Slovensku 1860–1989. [Political Parties in Slovakia 1860-1989] (in Slovak)
- 1992 Vatikán a Slovenská republika (1939–1945). Dokumenty. [The Vatican and the Slovak Republic (1939–1945). Documents.] (in Slovak)
- 1997 Jozef Tiso. Tanulmánya [Jozef Tiso. Study] (in Hungarian)
- 2000 Historik v čase a priestore. Laudatio Ľubomírovi Liptákovi. [Historian in Time and Space. Laudatio for Ľubomír Lipták] (in Slovak).
- 2003 Holokaust na Slovensku. Vol. 2. Prezident, vláda, Snem SR a Štátna rada o židovskej otázke (1939–1945). Dokumenty. [The Holocaust in Slovakia. Vol. 2. The President, Government, Diet and State Council of the Slovak Republic on the Jewish Question (1939–1945). Documents]. (in Slovak)
- 2004 Holokaust na Slovensku. Vol. 5. Židovské pracovné tábory a strediská na Slovensku 1938–1944. Dokumenty. [The Holocaust in Slovakia. Vol. 5. Jewish Labor Camps and Resorts in Slovakia 1938–1944. Documents] (in Slovak)

== Awards ==
- 1999 International literal prize of E. E. Kisch.
- 2008 Prize of the Slovak Academy of Sciences for a popular work about science.
- 2012 Scientist of the year 2012 in the category "Recognition for lifetime achievements in the Slovak Republic".
- 2017 Order of Ľudovít Štúr, 1st Class

== Sources ==
- Kamenec, Ivan (24 May 2013). Historik Kamenec: Tiso a Husák majú nepríjemne veľa spoločného (in Slovak).
- Paulovičová, Nina (2013). "The "Unmasterable Past"? The Reception of the Holocaust in Postcommunist Slovakia.". In Himka, John-Paul; Michlic, Joanna Beata (eds.). Bringing the Dark Past to Light. The Reception of the Holocaust in Postcommunist Europe. University of Nebraska Press. ISBN 978-0-8032-2544-2.
- Mikuličová, Ivanka (2008). "Výberová bibliografia PhDr. Ivana Kamenca, CSc.". Z dejín demokratických a totalitných režimov na Slovensku a v Československu v 20. storočí. Historik Ivan Kamenec (in Slovak). Bratislava: Historický ústav SAV. ISBN 978-80-969782-6-7.
- Tkadlečková, Herta (2008). "O Ivanovi Kamencovi – celkom neoficiálne". Z dejín demokratických a totalitných režimov na Slovensku a v Československu v 20. storočí. Historik Ivan Kamenec (in Slovak). Bratislava: Historický ústav SAV. ISBN 978-80-969782-6-7.
- Nižňanský, Eduard. "The Holocaust in Slovakia – period of Autonomy (6. 10. 1938 – 14. 3. 1939). Documents. Preface". Archived from the original on 4 March 2016.
- "Osobnosti ocenené v súťaži Vedec roka SR 2012" (in Slovak). The Ministry of Education, Science, Research and Sport of the Slovak Republic.
- "About Us" (in Slovak). Holocaust Documentation Center. Archived from the original on 11 September 2014.
- "List of Members" (in Slovak). Czech-Slovak Commission of Historians.
- "Curriculum Vitae of Ivan Kamenec" (in Slovak). Civil Association Osobnosti.sk.
- "Historik Ivan Kamenec dostal Rad Ľudovíta Štúra I. triedy" (in Slovak). Slovak Academy of Sciences. 10 January 2017.
