= List of Holocaust transports from Slovakia =

List of deportation transports from Slovakia during the Holocaust

Deportation of Jews from Slovakia
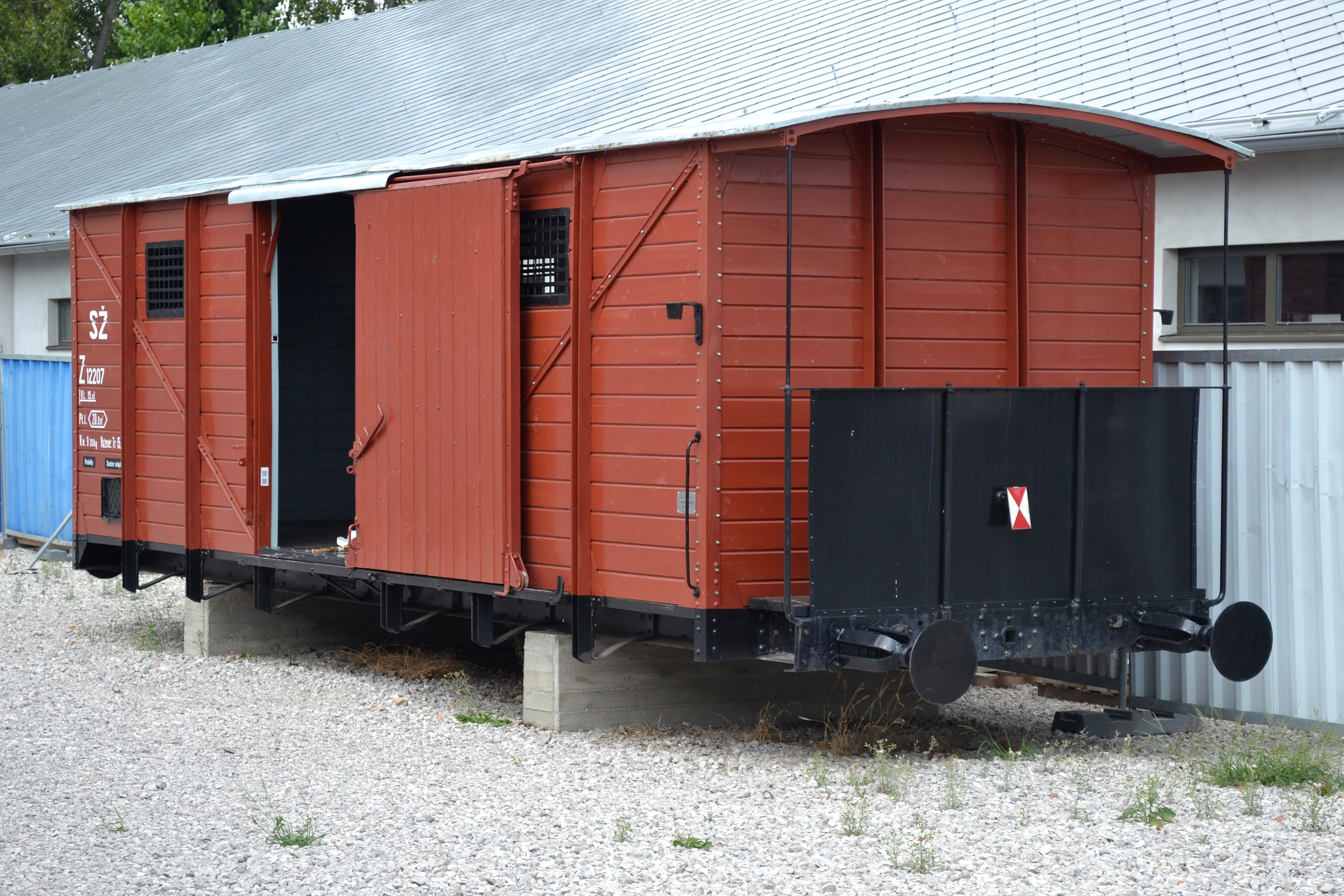
- Restored train car used to transport Slovak Jews
- Date: 1942 and 1944–1945
- Location: Slovak Republic, General Governorate, Nazi Germany
- Target: Slovak Jews
- Organised by: Slovak Republic, Nazi Germany
- Deaths: 57,000 (1942); 10,000 (1944–1945); Total: 67,000

During the Holocaust, most of Slovakia's Jewish population was deported in two waves—in 1942 and in 1944–1945. In 1942, there were two destinations: 18,746 Jews were deported in eighteen transports to Auschwitz concentration camp and another 39,000–40,000 (Note: Estimates include 39,006 (Katarína Hradská), 39,875 (Gila Fatran), 39,883 (Yehoshua Büchler), or 39,899 passengers (Laura Crago and Janina Kiełboń). The exact number is unknown and impossible to determine due to discrepancies in the sources. For example, some Jews died or committed suicide before they were deported or during transport and were not counted consistently.) were deported in thirty-eight transports to Majdanek and Sobibór extermination camps and various ghettos in the Lublin district of the General Governorate. A total of 57,628 people were deported; only a few hundred returned. In 1944 and 1945, 13,500 Jews were deported to Auschwitz (8,000 deportees), with smaller numbers sent to the Sachsenhausen, Ravensbrück, Bergen-Belsen, and Theresienstadt concentration camps. Altogether, these deportations resulted in the deaths of around 67,000 of the 89,000 Jews living in Slovakia.

== Background ==
List of Holocaust transports from Slovakia (Slovakia)

In the political crisis that followed the September 1938 Munich Agreement, the conservative, ethnonationalist Slovak People’s Party unilaterally declared a state of autonomy for Slovakia within Czechoslovakia. Slovak Jews, who numbered 89,000 in 1940, were targeted for persecution. In November 1938, 7,500 Jews (impoverished or without Slovak citizenship) were deported to the Hungarian border. Although they were allowed to return within a few months, these deportations were a rehearsal for those to follow in 1942.

On 14 March 1939, the Slovak State declared independence with German support. Many Jews lost their jobs and property due to Aryanization, which resulted in large numbers of them becoming impoverished. This became a pressing social problem for the Slovak government, which it "solved" by deporting the unemployed Jews. Slovakia initially agreed with the German government to deport 20,000 Jews of working age to German-occupied Poland, paying Nazi Germany 500 Reichsmarks each (supposedly to cover the cost of resettlement). However, this was only the first step in the deportation of all Jews, because deporting workers while leaving their families behind would worsen the economic situation of the remaining Jews.

In the meantime, Nazi Germany had been working towards the Final Solution—the murder of all the Jews that it could reach. In 1939, the Lublin District in German-occupied Poland was set aside as a "Jewish reservation". In 1942 it became a reception point for Jews from Nazi Germany and Slovakia. Starting in late 1941, the Schutzstaffel (SS) began planning for the deportation of the Jews in Lublin to the Operation Reinhard death camps—Bełżec, Sobibór and Treblinka—to free up space for the Slovak and German Jews.

== 1942 ==
=== Initial phase ===
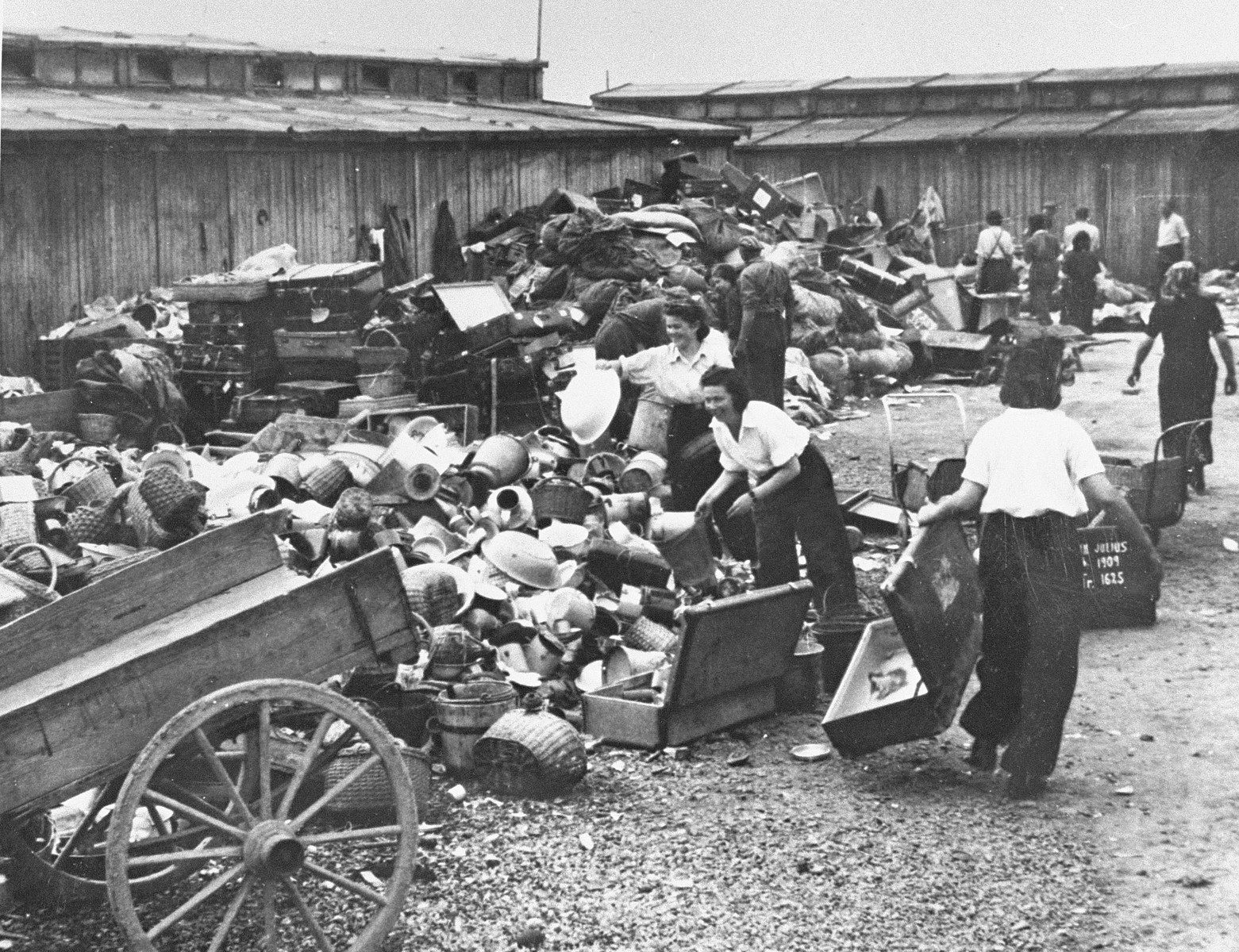
Linda Reich (center), deported on the first transport from Slovakia, and other prisoners sort belongings confiscated from Jews deported from Carpathian Ruthenia, 1944

The original deportation plan, approved in February 1942 by the German and Slovak governments, entailed the deportation of 7,000 single women aged 16–35 to Auschwitz and 13,000 single men aged 16–45 to Majdanek as forced laborers. The cover name for the operation was Aktion David. The SS officer and Judenberater (adviser on Jewish issues) Dieter Wisliceny and Slovak officials promised that deportees would not be mistreated and would be allowed to return home after a fixed period. Initially, many Jews believed that it was better to report for deportation than risk reprisals against their families for failing to do so. However, 3,000 of the 7,000 women who were supposed to be deported refused to report as ordered. Methods of escape included sham marriages, being sent away to live with relatives, or being hidden temporarily by non-Jews. The Hlinka Guard struggled to meet its targets; as a result, only 3,800 women and 4,500 men were deported during the initial phase of deportations. Nevertheless, they opened "a new chapter in the history of the Holocaust" because the Slovak women were the first Jewish prisoners in Auschwitz. Their arrival precipitated the conversion of the camp into an extermination camp.

Department 14, a subsidiary of Slovakia's Central Economic Office, organized the transports, while the Slovak Transport Ministry provided the cattle cars. Members of the Hlinka Guard, the Freiwillige Schutzstaffel (FS) and the gendarmerie were in charge of rounding up the Jews, guarding the transit centers, and eventually loading them into overcrowded cattle cars for deportation. Transports were timed to reach the Slovak border near Čadca at 04:28. (Note: Transports left Patrónka, Poprad, and Nováky in the evening, and Žilina at 03:20.) In Zwardon at 08:30, the Hlinka Guard turned the transports over to the German Schutzpolizei. The transports would arrive in Auschwitz the same afternoon and at Majdanek the next morning.

On 25 March 1942, the first transport train left Poprad at 20:00. Before its departure, Wisliceny spoke to the deportees on the platform, saying that they would be allowed to return home after they finished the work that Germany had planned for them. The first deportees were unaware of what lay ahead and tried to be optimistic. According to survivors, songs in Hebrew and Slovak were sung as the first two transports of women to Auschwitz left the platforms. Most of the Slovak Jewish women deported to Auschwitz in 1942 who survived the war were from the first two transports in March, because they were younger and stronger. Those from eastern Slovakia were especially likely to be young, because most Jews from that area were Haredim and tended to marry young: more than half were aged 21 or younger. The women deported from Bratislava were older on average because they married later in life and some did not marry at all; only 40 percent were 21 or younger.

Date	Source	Destination	Number of deportees
25–26 March	Poprad	Auschwitz	997
27 March	Žilina	Majdanek	1000
27–28 March	Patrónka	Auschwitz	798, 1000, or 1002
28–30 March	Sereď	Majdanek	1000
30–31 March	Nováky	Majdanek	1003
1–2 April	Patrónka	Auschwitz	965
2–3 April	Poprad	Auschwitz	997
5 April	Žilina	Majdanek	1495
Most information can also be verified to Fatran 2007, p. 180

=== Transports to Lublin ===
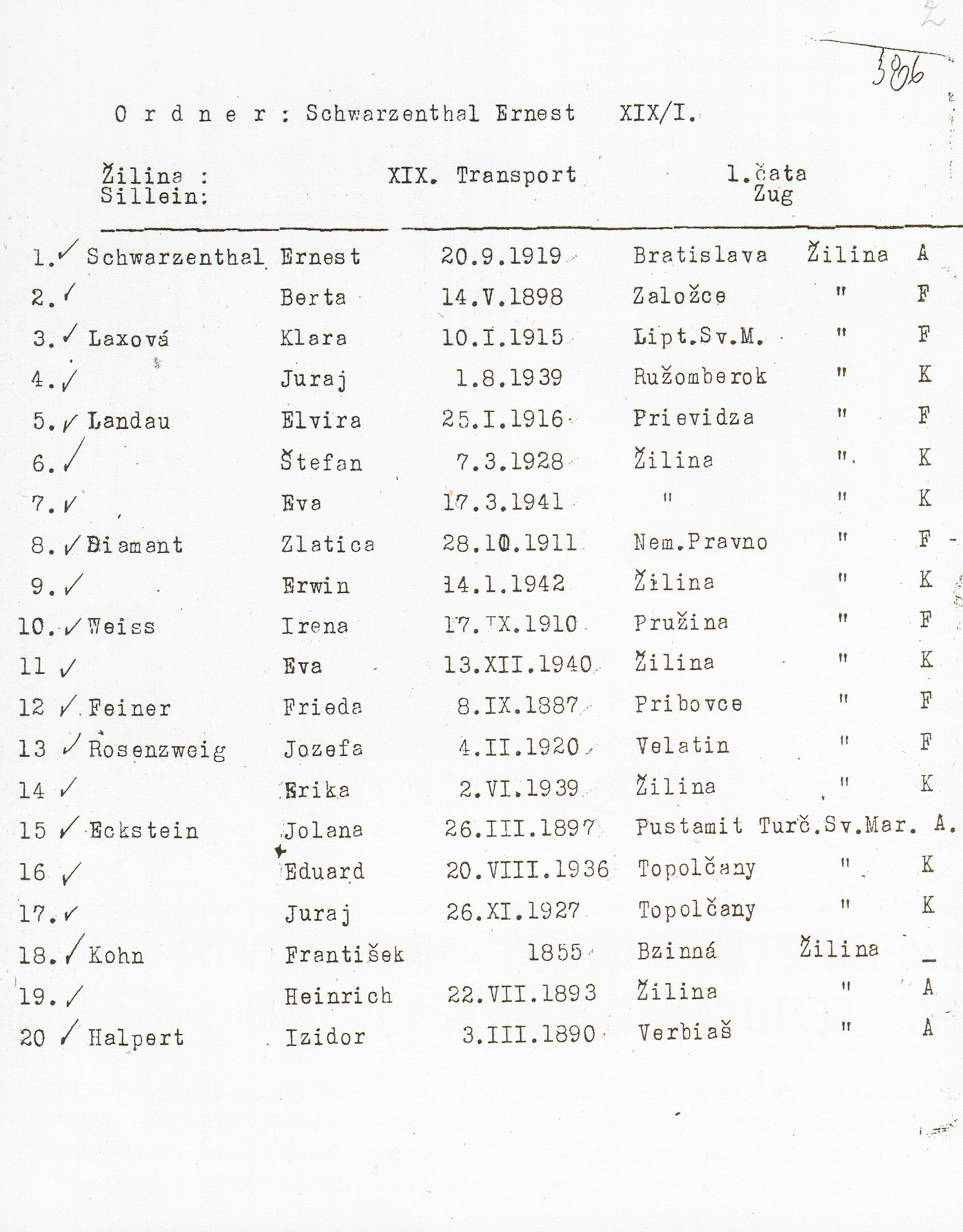
List of Jews deported from Žilina to Sobibór extermination camp, 14 June 1942

SS leader Reinhard Heydrich visited Bratislava on 10 April 1942. He and Vojtech Tuka agreed that further deportations would target whole families and eventually remove all Jews from Slovakia. Ostensibly, the change was to avoid separating families, but it also solved the problem of caring for the children and elderly family members of able-bodied deportees. The family transports began on 11 April and took their victims to the Lublin district. This change disrupted the SS's plans in the Lublin district. Instead of able-bodied male Slovak Jews being deported to Majdanek, the SS needed to prepare space for Slovak Jewish families in the region's overcrowded ghettos. The transports from Slovakia were the largest and longest of all the deportations of Jews to the Lublin District.

The trains went through two railway distribution points, in Nałęczów and Lublin, where they were met by a ranking SS officer. In Lublin, there was usually a selection and able-bodied men were selected for labor at Majdanek, while the remainder were sent to ghettos along the rail lines. For the trains that went through Nałęczów, the Jews were dispatched to locations seeking forced labor, usually without separating families. Most of the trains brought their victims (30,000 in total) to ghettos whose inhabitants had been recently deported to the Bełżec or Sobibór death camps, as part of a "revolving door" policy in which foreign Jews were brought in to replace those murdered. The final transports to the Lublin district occurred during the first half of June 1942; ten transports stopped briefly at Majdanek, where able-bodied men (generally those aged 15–50) were selected for labor; the trains continued to Sobibór, where the remaining victims were murdered.

The victims were given only four hours warning to prevent them from escaping. Beatings and forcible beard shaving were commonplace, as was subjecting Jews to invasive searches to uncover hidden valuables. Although some guards and local officials accepted bribes to keep Jews off the transports, the victim would typically be deported on the next train. Others took advantage of their power to rape Jewish women. Jews were only allowed to bring 50 kilograms (110 lb) of personal items with them, but even this was frequently stolen. Official exemptions were supposed to keep Jews from being deported, but local authorities sometimes deported exemption holders.

Most groups stayed only briefly in the Lublin ghettos before they were deported again to the death camps, while a few remained in the ghettos for months or years. Several thousand of the deportees ended up in the forced-labor camps in the Lublin area (such as Poniatowa, Końskowola, and Krychów). Unusually, the deportees in the Lublin area were quickly able to establish contact with the Jews remaining in Slovakia, which led to extensive aid efforts. However, the fate of the Jews deported from Slovakia was ultimately "sealed within the framework of Operation Reinhard", along with that of the Polish Jews. Of the estimated 8,500 men who were deported directly to Majdanek, only 883 were still alive by July 1943. (Another few thousand Slovak Jews were deported to Majdanek following the liquidation of ghettos in the Lublin district, but most of them were murdered immediately.) The remaining Slovak Jews at Majdanek were shot during Operation Harvest Festival; the only significant group of Slovak Jews to remain in Lublin district was a group of about 100 at the Luftwaffe camp in Dęblin–Irena.

Date	Source	Destination	Secondary destination	Number of deportees	Notes
11–13 April	Trnava	Lubartów/Majdanek	Kamionka, Firlej	1040	About 900 Jews arrived in Lubartów from the first transport and 680 from the second. They were soon transferred elsewhere, mostly to Firlej and Ostrów.
14–15 April	Nitra	Lubartów/Majdanek	Ostrów Lubelski	1038	About 900 Jews arrived in Lubartów from the first transport and 680 from the second. They were soon transferred elsewhere, mostly to Firlej and Ostrów.
16–17 April	Nitra	Rejowiec/Majdanek	Trawniki	1048	About 840 Jews arrived in Rejowiec.
20 April	Nitra	Rejowiec		1030	
21–22 April	Topoľčany/Sereď	Opole		1001	From the five transports to Opole (totaling 4,302 deportees), only 1,400 Jews remained in the ghetto; the remainder were sent to labor camps in the area.
27 April	Nové Mesto nad Váhom, Piešťany, and Hlohovec	Opole	Poniatowa	1179–1382	From the five transports to Opole (totaling 4,302 deportees), only 1,400 Jews remained in the ghetto; the remainder were sent to labor camps in the area.
5–7 May	Trebišov	Lubartów/Majdanek	Kamionka	1040	841 Slovak Jews arrived in Lubartów.
6–8 May	Michalovce	Łuków		1038	Slovak Jews remained at Łuków until the ghetto's liquidation on 2 May 1943.
7–9 May	Michalovce	Łuków		1040	Slovak Jews remained at Łuków until the ghetto's liquidation on 2 May 1943.
8 May	Michalovce	Międzyrzec Podlaski		1001 or 1,025	
11 May	Humenné	Chełm		1009	The SS confiscated the deportees' luggage. Some were conscripted to work for the Wasserwirtschaftsinspektion (Water Regulation Authority) at Siedliszcze. Others were deported to Sobibór extermination camp on 22–23 May. The ghetto was liquidated on 5–9 November 1942.
12 May	Žilina	Chełm		1002	The SS confiscated the deportees' luggage. Some were conscripted to work for the Wasserwirtschaftsinspektion (Water Regulation Authority) at Siedliszcze. Others were deported to Sobibór extermination camp on 22–23 May. The ghetto was liquidated on 5–9 November 1942.
13 May	Prešov	Dęblin–Irena		1040	On 15 October 1942, most of the Slovak Jews were deported to Treblinka extermination camp. About a hundred Slovak Jewish men and women—the last significant group of Slovak Jews to survive in the Lublin area—were kept by the Luftwaffe to work as forced laborers on the nearby airfield. On 22 July 1944, they were sent to Częstochowa where a few dozen managed to survive until the liberation.
14 May	Prešov	Dęblin–Irena		1040	On 15 October 1942, most of the Slovak Jews were deported to Treblinka extermination camp. About a hundred Slovak Jewish men and women—the last significant group of Slovak Jews to survive in the Lublin area—were kept by the Luftwaffe to work as forced laborers on the nearby airfield. On 22 July 1944, they were sent to Częstochowa where a few dozen managed to survive until the liberation.
17–20 May	Bardejov	Końskowola		1,025 or 1028	The first transport to Końskowola included 700 elderly individuals and children. The second arrived before 2 June. At Końskowola, Slovak Jews were employed in agricultural labor and suffered from severe hunger. In early October, the ghetto was liquidated. Except for 500 to 1,000 craftsmen who were deported to labor camps in the area, the remaining Jews were shot, either during the roundups or in ravines near Rudy.
18 May	Bardejov	Opole	Poniatowa	1015	The first transport to Końskowola included 700 elderly individuals and children. The second arrived before 2 June. At Końskowola, Slovak Jews were employed in agricultural labor and suffered from severe hunger. In early October, the ghetto was liquidated. Except for 500 to 1,000 craftsmen who were deported to labor camps in the area, the remaining Jews were shot, either during the roundups or in ravines near Rudy.
19 May	Vranov	Opole	Kazimierz	1005	The first transport to Końskowola included 700 elderly individuals and children. The second arrived before 2 June. At Końskowola, Slovak Jews were employed in agricultural labor and suffered from severe hunger. In early October, the ghetto was liquidated. Except for 500 to 1,000 craftsmen who were deported to labor camps in the area, the remaining Jews were shot, either during the roundups or in ravines near Rudy.
20 May	Medzilaborce	Końskowola		1001 or 1,630	The first transport to Końskowola included 700 elderly individuals and children. The second arrived before 2 June. At Końskowola, Slovak Jews were employed in agricultural labor and suffered from severe hunger. In early October, the ghetto was liquidated. Except for 500 to 1,000 craftsmen who were deported to labor camps in the area, the remaining Jews were shot, either during the roundups or in ravines near Rudy.
23 or 27 May	Sabinov/Prešov	Rejowiec		1630	At Rejowiec, some Slovak Jews worked for the Jewish Ghetto Police. Either in June or August 1942, 2,000 mostly Slovak Jews were rounded up and deported to Sobibór; some 50–100 were taken out of the lines at Sobibór and sent to nearby Krychów forced-labor camp.
24 or 28 May	Stropkov/Bardejov	Rejowiec		1022	At Rejowiec, some Slovak Jews worked for the Jewish Ghetto Police. Either in June or August 1942, 2,000 mostly Slovak Jews were rounded up and deported to Sobibór; some 50–100 were taken out of the lines at Sobibór and sent to nearby Krychów forced-labor camp.
24–25 May	Poprad	Rejowiec		1000	At Rejowiec, some Slovak Jews worked for the Jewish Ghetto Police. Either in June or August 1942, 2,000 mostly Slovak Jews were rounded up and deported to Sobibór; some 50–100 were taken out of the lines at Sobibór and sent to nearby Krychów forced-labor camp.
25 or 26 May to 30 May	Žilina	Opole		1000	
29 May	Spišská Nová Ves	Izbica/Majdanek		1032 or 1052	At Izbica, Jews were held temporarily under extremely overcrowded conditions before being deported to Bełżec extermination camp and Sobibór.
29–30 May	Poprad	Izbica/Majdanek		1000	At Izbica, Jews were held temporarily under extremely overcrowded conditions before being deported to Bełżec extermination camp and Sobibór.
30 May–1 June	Poprad	Sobibór/Majdanek		1000	These transports were the only ones that went directly from Slovakia to one of the Operation Reinhard extermination camps. They signified the end of the "revolving door", as German policy shifted from temporarily warehousing Jews deported to Poland in ghettos to murdering them immediately.
2 June	Liptovský Svätý Mikuláš	Sobibór/Majdanek		1014	These transports were the only ones that went directly from Slovakia to one of the Operation Reinhard extermination camps. They signified the end of the "revolving door", as German policy shifted from temporarily warehousing Jews deported to Poland in ghettos to murdering them immediately.
5 June	Bratislava/Žilina	Sobibór/Majdanek		1000	These transports were the only ones that went directly from Slovakia to one of the Operation Reinhard extermination camps. They signified the end of the "revolving door", as German policy shifted from temporarily warehousing Jews deported to Poland in ghettos to murdering them immediately.
7 June	Bratislava/Žilina	Sobibór/Majdanek		1000	These transports were the only ones that went directly from Slovakia to one of the Operation Reinhard extermination camps. They signified the end of the "revolving door", as German policy shifted from temporarily warehousing Jews deported to Poland in ghettos to murdering them immediately.
8 June	Žilina	Sobibór/Majdanek		1001	These transports were the only ones that went directly from Slovakia to one of the Operation Reinhard extermination camps. They signified the end of the "revolving door", as German policy shifted from temporarily warehousing Jews deported to Poland in ghettos to murdering them immediately.
9 June	Zvolen/Kremnica	Sobibór/Majdanek		1019	These transports were the only ones that went directly from Slovakia to one of the Operation Reinhard extermination camps. They signified the end of the "revolving door", as German policy shifted from temporarily warehousing Jews deported to Poland in ghettos to murdering them immediately.
11 June	Nováky	Sobibór/Majdanek		1000	These transports were the only ones that went directly from Slovakia to one of the Operation Reinhard extermination camps. They signified the end of the "revolving door", as German policy shifted from temporarily warehousing Jews deported to Poland in ghettos to murdering them immediately.
12 June	Sereď/Žilina	Sobibór/Majdanek		1000	These transports were the only ones that went directly from Slovakia to one of the Operation Reinhard extermination camps. They signified the end of the "revolving door", as German policy shifted from temporarily warehousing Jews deported to Poland in ghettos to murdering them immediately.
12–13 June	Poprad	Sobibór/Majdanek		1000	These transports were the only ones that went directly from Slovakia to one of the Operation Reinhard extermination camps. They signified the end of the "revolving door", as German policy shifted from temporarily warehousing Jews deported to Poland in ghettos to murdering them immediately.
14 June	Nováky/Žilina	Sobibór/Majdanek		1000	These transports were the only ones that went directly from Slovakia to one of the Operation Reinhard extermination camps. They signified the end of the "revolving door", as German policy shifted from temporarily warehousing Jews deported to Poland in ghettos to murdering them immediately.
Where two primary destinations are listed, there was a selection in Lublin and able-bodied men (generally those aged 15–50 years) were sent to Majdanek. All information from Büchler 1991, p. 166 unless otherwise indicated. Most information can also be verified to Fatran 2007, p. 180; Silberklang 2013, pp. 303–306.

=== Transports to Auschwitz ===
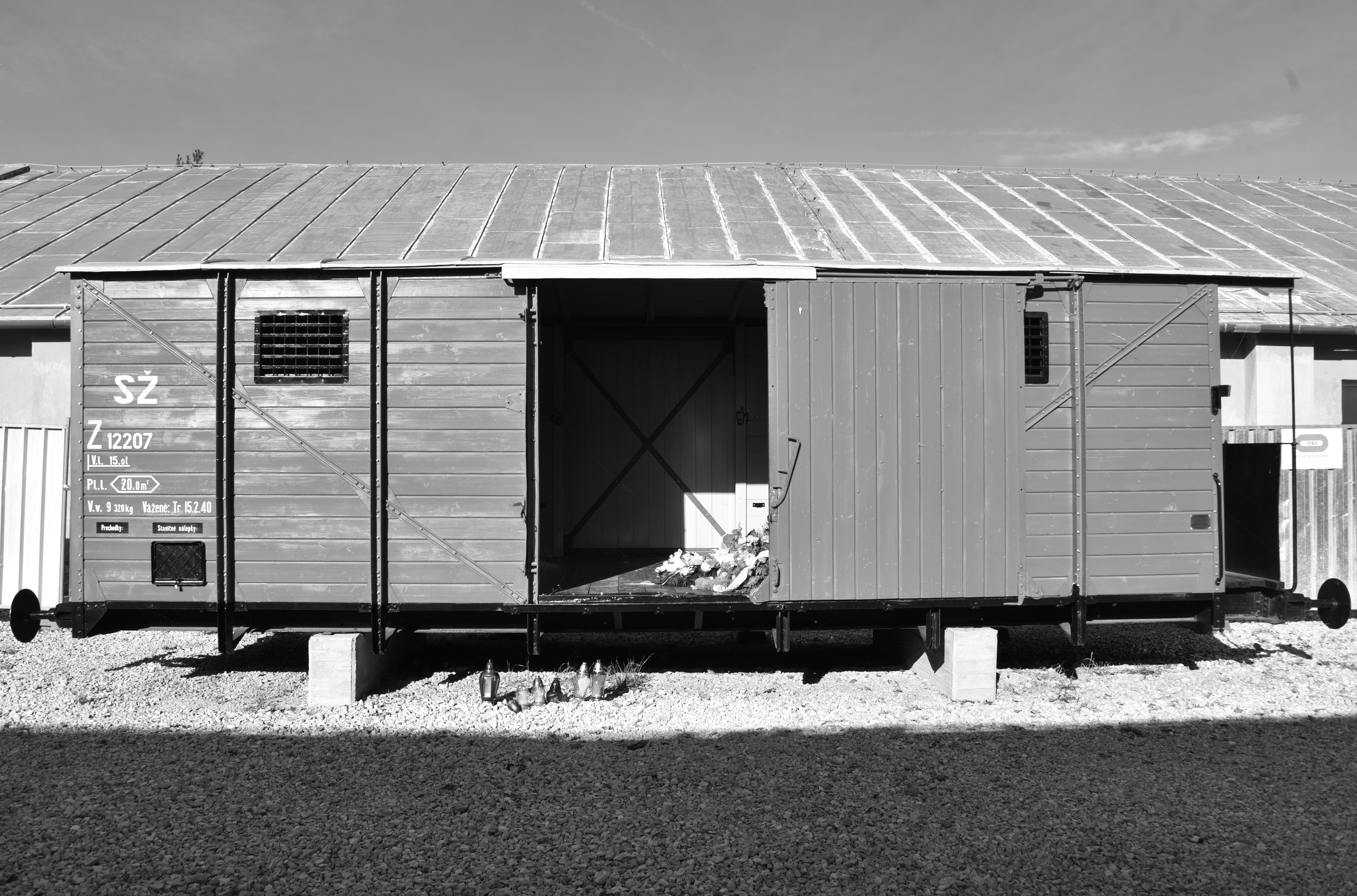
Restored train car used to transport Slovak Jews. SŽ stands for Slovenské Železnice (Slovak Railways).

A moratorium on transports to the east was imposed on 19 June 1942 due to military campaigns on the Eastern Front. The rest of the family transports (eight in total) were therefore directed to Auschwitz. The first arrived on 4 July, which led to the initial selection on the ramp at Auschwitz II-Birkenau, which became a regular event. The majority of deportees—especially mothers with children—were not chosen for forced labor and instead were killed in gas chambers. By 1 August, most of the Jews not exempt from deportation had already been deported or had fled to Hungary to avoid the deportations, leading to a six-week halt in the transports. An additional three trains departed for Auschwitz in September and October.

For the first three months after the arrival of the first transport in March, Slovak Jewish women were the only female Jewish prisoners in Auschwitz. In mid-August, most of the Slovak Jewish women at Auschwitz were transferred to Auschwitz II-Birkenau, which was still under construction. Conditions were much worse; employed mostly on outdoor labor details, most of the women died within the first four months at Birkenau. Along with backbreaking physical labor and starvation, many died in epidemics of typhus or malaria and the mass executions ordered by the SS to contain the epidemics. (To contain a typhus epidemic in October 1942, the SS murdered 6,000 prisoners—mostly Slovak Jewish women—including some who were healthy; another selection on 5 December eliminated the last major group of Slovak Jewish women in Birkenau.) Of the 404 men who were registered on 19 June, only 45 were still alive six weeks later. By the end of 1942, 92% of the deportees had died. This left only 500 or 600 Slovak Jews still alive at Auschwitz and its subcamps—about half of whom had obtained privileged positions in administration which allowed them to obtain the necessities for survival.

Date	Source	Women registered	Men registered	Murdered in gas chambers	Total	Notes
12–13 April	Sereď	443	634		1077	These transports contained single men and women as well as childless couples.
17 April	Žilina	27	973		1000	These transports contained single men and women as well as childless couples.
19 April	Žilina	536	46		1000	These transports contained single men and women as well as childless couples.
22–23 April	Poprad	457	543		1000	These transports contained single men and women as well as childless couples.
24 April	Žilina	558	442		1000	These transports contained single men and women as well as childless couples.
29 April	Žilina	300	423	300	1054	These two transports had to be supplemented with families with children to meet the quota.
19–20 June	Žilina	255	404	341	1000	These two transports had to be supplemented with families with children to meet the quota.
3–4 July	Žilina	108	264	628	1000	This was the first family transport to Auschwitz, the first selection ever on the ramp at Birkenau, and the first group to be murdered in Bunker II.
10–11 July	Žilina	148	182	670	1000	
16–18 July	Žilina	178	327	459	1000	
24–25 July	Žilina	93	192	715	1000	
31 July–1 August	Žilina	75	165	608	848	By 1 August, most of the Jews not exempt from deportation had already been deported or had fled to Hungary, leading to a six-week halt in the transports.
19 September	Žilina	71	206	723	1000	The final transports targeted Jews in the labor camps, especially those who were mentally or physically disabled.
23 September	Žilina	67	294	639	1000	The final transports targeted Jews in the labor camps, especially those who were mentally or physically disabled.
20–21 October	Žilina	78	121	649	848 (or 860)	The final transports targeted Jews in the labor camps, especially those who were mentally or physically disabled.
All information from Büchler 1996, p. 320 except source locations, from Fatran 2007, pp. 180–181. Most of it can also be verified to Czech 1997, pp. 154, 157–160, 184, 191–192, 196, 199, 203, 208, 241, 243, 256.

=== Summary ===
Between 25 March and 20 October 1942, about 57,700 (Note: Estimates include 57,628 and 57,752.) Jews (two-thirds of the population) were deported. Sixty-three of the deportation trains from Slovakia were organized by Franz Novak. The deportations disproportionately affected poor, rural, and Orthodox Jews; although the Šariš-Zemplín region in eastern Slovakia lost 85 to 90 percent of its Jewish population, Žilina reported that almost half of its Jews remained after the deportation. The deportees were held briefly in camps in Slovakia before deportation; 26,384 from Žilina, 7,500 from Patrónka, 7,000 from Poprad, 4,160 (or 4,463) from Sereď, and 4,000 to 5,000 from Nováky. Eighteen trains with 18,746 victims went to Auschwitz, and another thirty-eight transports (with 39,000 to 40,000 deportees) went to ghettos and concentration and extermination camps in the Lublin district. Only a few hundred (estimated at 250 or 800) survived the war. Czech historian Daniel Putík estimates that only 1.5 percent (around 280 people) of those deported to Auschwitz in 1942 survived, while the death rate of those deported to the Lublin region approached 100 percent.

Attempts by Germany and Slovak People's Party radicals to resume the transports in 1943 were unsuccessful due to the opposition of Slovak moderates and were followed by a two-year hiatus.

== 1944–1945 ==
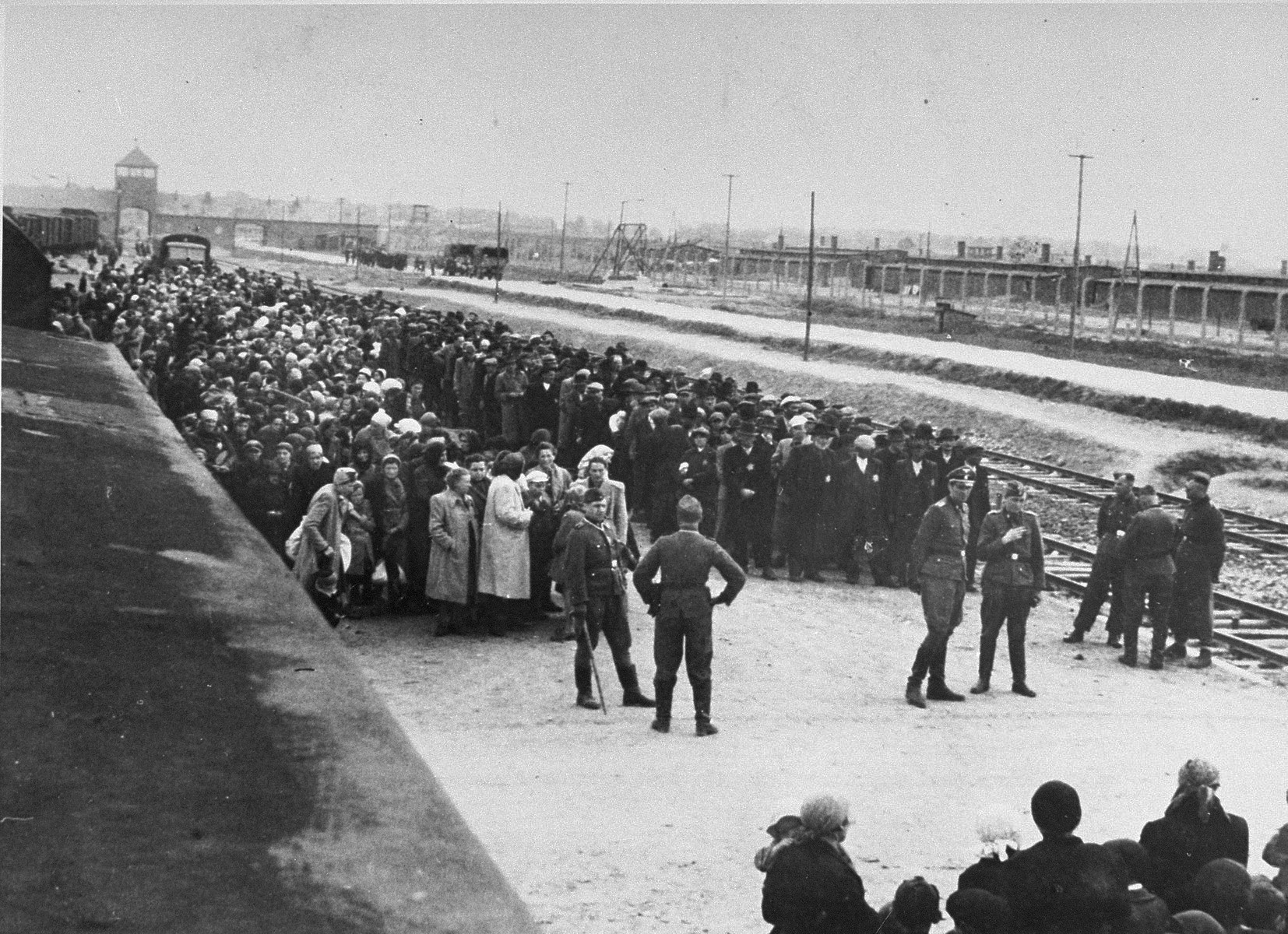
Selection on the ramp at Auschwitz II-Birkenau in 1944 (from the Auschwitz Album)

Increasing Slovak partisan activity triggered a German invasion on 29 August 1944. The partisans responded by launching a full-scale uprising. The insurgents seized a large portion of central Slovakia but were defeated by the end of October. Einsatzgruppe H, one of the SS death squads, was formed to deport or murder the estimated 25,000 Jews remaining in Slovakia. Einsatzgruppe H was aided by local collaborators, including SS-Heimatschutz, Abwehrgruppe 218, and the Hlinka Guard Emergency Divisions. Most of the Jews who were exempted from the 1942 deportations lived in western Slovakia, but following the invasion many fled to the mountains.

Slovak historian Ivan Kamenec estimated that 13,500 Jews were deported, of whom 10,000 died, but Israeli historian Gila Fatran and Czech historian Lenka Šindelářová consider that 14,150 deportees can be verified and the true figure may be higher. Of these, between 6,734 and 7,936 were deported to Auschwitz and another 5,000 to Ravensbrück, Sachsenhausen, Bergen-Belsen, and Theresienstadt. From Slovakia, Ravensbrück received transports totaling 1,600 women and children (mostly Jews) and 478 male prisoners, including Jews, Romani people, and political opponents. About 1,550 to 1,750 men (mostly Jews) were deported to Sachsenhausen, while about 200–300 people were deported from Sereď to Bergen-Belsen, especially Jews in mixed marriages and some intact families of Jews. Between 1,454 and 1,467 Jews were deported to Theresienstadt, especially the elderly, orphans, and women with young children. About 200 or 300 Slovak political prisoners were deported to Mauthausen on 19 January and 31 March 1945. Many of those deported to the concentration camps in Germany were sent onwards to satellite camps, where they worked mostly in war industries. On four transports from Sereď, selections were carried out at the camp with different cars being directed to Sachsenhausen, Bergen-Belsen, Ravensbrück, and/or Theresienstadt. Many details of the transports are unknown, because much of the documentation was destroyed by the perpetrators, requiring historians to rely on survivor testimonies.

Date	Source	Destination	Number of deportees	Notes
1 September	Čadca	Auschwitz	100+	Six men and eight women were registered at the camp. 72 males and an unknown number of females were sent to the gas chambers.
5 September	Čadca	Auschwitz		One man and two women were registered at the camp. An unknown number were sent to the gas chambers.
20 September	Unknown	Auschwitz	177	From this transport, 146 people were sent to the gas chambers and the remainder were registered. Israeli historian Gila Fatran estimates a total of 400 Jews were deported on the three transports.
30 September	Sereď	Auschwitz	1860	
3 October	Sereď	Auschwitz	1836	
10–12 October	Sereď	Auschwitz	1882 or 1890	
17–19 October	Sereď	Auschwitz	862 or 920	113 Jewish women were registered.
2 November	Sereď	Auschwitz	920 or 930	The gas chambers of Auschwitz were used for the last time on the previous day. All of the deportees were registered at the camp without a selection.
2–3 November	Prešov	Ravensbrück	364	Mostly Jews, some Romani people. According to Fatran, about 100 Jews in total were deported from Prešov.
9 November	Ilava	Germany	183	This transport included Jews but the prisoners were predominantly non-Jewish. According to a German official, another transport with 100 individuals had been dispatched from Ilava the previous week, and also sent to Germany. According to Fatran, the total number of Jews deported from Ilava was about 100.
c. 15 November	Sereď	Ravensbrück	488	Jews
16 November	Sereď	Sachsenhausen, Bergen-Belsen	600–800 (Sachsenhausen), 100–200 (Bergen-Belsen)	Mostly Jews; there were some Mischlinge sent to Bergen-Belsen
28 November	Prešov	Ravensbrück	53	Women and children, mostly Jewish
2–3 December	Sereď	Sachsenhausen, Ravensbrück, Theresienstadt	about 580 (Sachsenhausen), 160–200 (Ravensbrück), 416 or 421 (Theresienstadt)	Jews and several political prisoners were sent to Sachsenhausen; the transport to Ravensbrück consisted of Jewish women; those sent to Theresienstadt were exclusively Jews. According to Slovak historian Katarína Hradská, the transport arrived in Theresienstadt on 23 December; 382 of those deported to Theresienstadt survived.
c. 10 January	Kežmarok	Ravensbrück	47	Women and children, mostly Jews and some Romani people; also some political prisoners.
16 January	Sereď	Sachsenhausen, Ravensbrück, Theresienstadt	370 (Sachsenhausen), 260–310 (Ravensbrück), 127 or 129 (Theresienstadt)	Sent to Sachsenhausen were Jewish men and political prisoners; Jewish women were sent to Ravensbrück; the Jews sent to Theresienstadt were mostly those incapable of work The transport arrived in Theresienstadt 19 January and 127 of the 129 deportees survived.
9–12 March	Sereď	Theresienstadt	548	According to Hradská, there were 546 survivors.
31 March–7 April	Sereď	Theresienstadt	354	According to Hradská, there were 352 survivors.

An estimated 10,000 of the deportees died. The mortality rate was highest on the transports to Auschwitz in September and October, because there was a selection and most of the deportees were immediately murdered in the gas chambers. The death rate of those deported to concentration camps in Germany was around 25–50 percent. Of those deported to the Theresienstadt Ghetto, however, 98 percent survived. The high death rate at concentration camps such as Sachsenhausen, Bergen-Belsen and Ravensbrück was due to the exploitation of forced labor for total war and inmates were murdered based on their inability to work, rather than their race or religion. Others died during the death marches. Between several hundred and 2,000 Jews were killed in Slovakia, and about 10,850 survived to be liberated by the Red Army in March and April 1945.

Destination	Killed	Total	Notes
Auschwitz	Most	6,734–7,936	
Bergen-Belsen	30–50 percent	200–300	Very few of the children deported to Bergen-Belsen survived.
Ravensbrück	Less than 30 percent	About 2,000	
Sachsenhausen	At least 25 percent	1,550–1,750	
Theresienstadt	2 percent (40 people)	1,454–1,467	Hradská attributes the deaths to natural causes
Not deported	Several hundred to 2,000	10,850 survived	
All information from Putík 2015, p. 47 unless otherwise indicated.
