= Einsatzgruppe H =

- Active: August 1944
- Disbanded: March 1945
- Country: Germany
- Allegiance: Nazi
- Branch: Einsatzgruppen
- Type: Paramilitary
- Role: To deport or murder the remaining Jews in the Slovak Republic
- Size: 700

Commanders
- Notable commanders: Josef Witiska

Einsatzgruppe H was one of the Einsatzgruppen, the paramilitary death squads of Nazi Germany. A special task force of more than 700 soldiers, it was created at the end of August 1944 to deport or murder the remaining Jews in Slovakia following the German suppression of the Slovak National Uprising. During its seven-month existence, Einsatzgruppe H collaborated closely with the Hlinka Guard Emergency Divisions and arrested 18,937 people, of whom at least 2,257 were murdered; thousands of others were deported to Nazi concentration camps (primarily Auschwitz). The victims included Jews, Romani people, actual or suspected Slovak partisans, and real or perceived political opponents. One of its component units, Einsatzkommando 14, committed two of the largest massacres in the history of Slovakia, at Kremnička and Nemecká.

== Background ==
On 14 March 1939, the Slovak State proclaimed its independence under the protection of Nazi Germany. According to the United States Holocaust Memorial Museum, the persecution of Jews was "central to the domestic policy of the Slovak state". Between 26 March and 20 October 1942, about 57,000 Jews, two-thirds of the Jews in Slovakia at the time, were deported. Only a few hundred survived the war. In 1943, the defeat at Stalingrad turned many Slovaks against the Axis-aligned regime, and the government refused to continue with deportations. It was now evident to the Slovak population that Germany would not win the war, and high casualties on the Eastern Front caused many ordinary Slovaks and large sections of the army to turn against the fascist regime; many retreated to the mountains and formed partisan groups. Concerned about the increase in resistance and suspecting the loyalty of the Slovaks, Germany invaded Slovakia, precipitating the Slovak National Uprising, which broke out on 29 August 1944.

The Reich Security Main Office (RSHA) assigned Einsatzgruppe H to implement the Final Solution in Slovakia, and deport or murder the 25,000 ethnic Jews remaining in Slovakia. Most of these were converts to Christianity, in mixed marriages, deemed essential to the economy, or protected by other exemptions that had prevented their deportation in 1942. Because of the advance of the Red Army into Poland, the Nazis wanted to deport Slovakia's remaining Jews to Auschwitz as soon as possible, as the camp would shut down its gas chambers in November.

== Formation ==
Einsatzgruppe H and its two main component units, Einsatzkommandos 13 and 14, were formed in Brno (in the Protectorate of Bohemia and Moravia) upon the outbreak of the Slovak National Uprising, on 28 or 29 August. Its commander was SS-Obersturmbannfuhrer Josef Witiska. Other German units were tasked with the military suppression of the uprising; Einsatzgruppe H's main focus was to implement the Final Solution in Slovakia. To this end, it intervened with the Slovak government and public life, carried out military actions against partisans, engaged in roundups, and committed massacres. The unit also submitted regular, detailed reports to Berlin concerning all aspects of life in Slovakia, including the military situation, Jews, public opinion, and culture. It exceeded its remit by targeting other groups, including partisans and Romani people.

== Military role ==
SS General Gottlob Berger, who was appointed German military commander in Slovakia to suppress the uprising, and his superiors in Berlin, believed that the partisans would be defeated in a few days, despite warnings from Karl Hermann Frank and others. Too few German troops were dispatched, so Einsatzgruppe H was drafted into active military actions, focusing on disarming Slovak Army units perceived to be unreliable. Due to his failure to suppress the uprising, Berger was recalled after three weeks and General Hermann Höfle replaced him. Banská Bystrica, the rebel headquarters, fell on 27 October, and the partisans shifted their strategy to guerrilla warfare.

== Anti-Jewish actions ==
Two days after the outbreak of the rebellion, Witiska met with Berger; the German ambassador to Slovakia, Hanns Ludin; Erich Ehrlinger of the RSHA; and Erwin Weinmann, the commander of the SS and SD in the Protectorate. The object of this meeting was to discuss how to implement a "radical solution" (German: radikalen Lösung) to the "Jewish question" in Slovakia.

Most Jews were captured during roundups; either they were imprisoned at local prisons or else taken to the Einsatzgruppe H office in Bratislava, from which they were sent to Sereď concentration camp for deportation. In many cases, the local authorities provided lists of Jews. By this time, the Jews knew that deportation meant probable death, so many tried to flee, go into hiding, or otherwise avoid arrest. The attitude of the local population was ambivalent; some risked their lives to hide Jews, while others turned them in to the police.

Following the uprising, Einsatzgruppe H collaborated with the Hlinka Guard Emergency Divisions (POHG) and a local Volksdeutsche paramilitary organization, the Heimatschutz (HS), to create an atmosphere of terror in rural Slovakia, perpetrating public executions and massacres of Jews, Romani people, and those suspected of supporting partisans. The success of Einsatzgruppe H was largely due to denunciations and the cooperation of the POHG and the HS, were able to impersonate partisans due to their local knowledge and ability to speak Slovak. These collaborators participated in the massacres, aided with interrogations, and searched houses for Jews in hiding.

== Organization ==
Einsatzgruppe H was organized hierarchically as were other Einsatzgruppe units. It was run from a central headquarters in Bratislava, where Witiska maintained an office at Palisády 42 with about 160 personnel. At its peak, the unit had six subunits with stationary headquarters: Sonderkommando 7a, Einsatzkommandos 13 and 14, and zb-V Kommandos 15, 27, and 29. Of these, Einsatzkommandos 13 and 14 and zb-V Kommando 27 were newly formed, while the other units had been transferred from other duties. Not all were subordinated to Einsatzgruppe H for the entirety of their activities in Slovakia; for instance, zb-V Kommando 27, which operated in eastern Slovakia from September 1944, was subordinated to the SD office in Kraków until January 1945. Except for zb-V Kommando 15, dissolved in February, the units continued to exist until the liberation of Slovakia by the Red Army, at which point most of the personnel fled into Moravia. More than 700 soldiers served in Einsatzgruppe H at one point, although the exact numbers cannot be determined.

Organizationally, the unit was part of the Wehrmacht, but it was never under Wehrmacht operational control. On 15 November 1944, the unit was transferred to the control of the SD and ceased to be called Einsatzgruppe H officially, but the unit maintained the same personnel. A few days later, Witiska was promoted to the head of the SiPo and SD in Slovakia, but maintained control over the unit.

Although the members of the unit were very diverse in terms of age, education, and affiliation with the Nazi Party, most had previous experience with combat or rear-area operations. Some were Slovaks.

=== Einsatzkommando 13 ===
Einsatzkommando 13 (sk) was commanded by Otto Koslowski, Hans Jaskulsky, and then Karl Schmitz. 446 Jews were rounded up in western and central Slovakia by Einsatzkommando 13; they were held at Ilava prison before being deported from Žilina to concentration camps in Germany.

- On 13/14 September, the unit did a roundup in Žilina, arresting hundreds of Jews who were held in Sereď and Ilava before their deportation to concentration camps, especially Auschwitz. Few survived the war.

=== Einsatzkommando 14 ===
Einsatzkommando 14 (cs, sk), commanded by Georg Heuser, was the main unit of Einsatzgruppe H. Heuser had been the commander of the SiPo in Minsk, where he had helped organize the mass shootings of Belarusian Jews. Einsatzkommando 14 advanced behind the SS front-line unit Kampfgruppe Schill from Nitra to Topoľčany, where it set up a temporary headquarters. In mid-September, the unit moved farther east to Baťovany, and after the fall of Banská Bystrica in late October it moved to that location.

The unit was responsible for 2,876 murders, including the largest massacres on Slovak territory: Kremnička massacre, with at least 747 victims, and Nemecká massacre, with some 900 victims. These massacres were committed in cooperation with the POHG and the HS.

- On 3 September, the unit conducted a hunt for hidden Jews in Topoľčany.
- On 11 September 1944, the unit shot 350 Jews at Nemčice (near Topoľčany), including women, children, and a four-month-old infant.
- On 3 October, 48 people were shot at Martin for alleged partisan activities.
- On 24 November the unit arrested 109 Romani people from the village of Ilija, including women and children, who were later shot at Kremnička.
- On 12 December, 31 people were removed from the prison in Brezno and murdered in a nearby field. The bodies were buried in a shallow trench and exhumed ten days later after the Germans were persuaded that it was a health hazard. Victims included several partisans and an entire Jewish family, including seven-year-old Ladislav Ferenc.
- In January 1945, four alleged guerillas were hanged in Zlaté Moravce.
- Also in January, seven Jews found in hiding in Donovaly were shot along with their rescuer, and the house burned down.

=== Einsatzkommando 29 ===
Einsatzkommando 29 and local collaborators committed the 28 September roundup in Bratislava, organized by Alois Brunner. On 26 September, the Germans raided the Jewish Center, obtaining a list of Jews, with which they prepared the operation. On the night of 28 September, 1,600 or 1,800 Jews in Bratislava were arrested and held in the Jewish Council's headquarters until 6 am, when they were loaded onto freight cars and transported to Sereď, arriving at 2 am on 30 September. They were deported to Auschwitz concentration camp later that month, where most were murdered. Notably, the victims included most of the leadership of the Working Group, a Jewish resistance organization. This was the largest roundup in Slovakia and an example of Slovak collaboration. After the September operation, Einsatzkommando 29 established an office in the former Jewish Center (Edelgasse 6) to hunt down Jews in hiding. When Jews were captured, they were interrogated and tortured if they did not give the names and addresses of other Jews in hiding. The bodies of victims who were tortured to death were thrown into the Danube. This was staffed largely from members of the Heimatschutz.

== Summary ==
According to Einsatzgruppe H's official records, the unit arrested 18,937 people: 9,653 Jews, 3,409 "bandits" (actual or suspected partisans), 2,186 defectors, 714 resistance members, 172 Romani people and 546 others. Of these, 2,257 were subjected to Sonderbehandlung (summary execution). The unit captured the leaders of the uprising, Generals Jan Golian and Rudolf Viest, as well as a few American and British military personnel and German soldiers suspected of defeatism or homosexuality.

After the liberation of Slovakia by the Red Army, 211 mass graves with 5,304 victims shot by Axis forces in late 1944 and early 1945 were discovered; a quarter of the victims were women and children. Some 90 villages were razed. Of the approximately 25,000 Jews present in Slovakia at the beginning of the uprising, 13,500 were deported—most of whom died—and several hundred massacred in Slovakia.

== Trials ==
Witiska committed suicide in American captivity in 1946, in order to avoid being brought to trial in Czechoslovakia. Koslowski, the commander of Einsatzkommando 13, was sentenced to death by a Czechoslovak court and executed in Brno in 1947. Twenty-two of the officers were convicted, four of them in Czechoslovakia for crimes committed in the Czech lands, three in Yugoslavia, two in Poland, and one each in Austria, Slovakia, and France (the remainder were convicted by Germany) but these convictions were for other crimes. Most members of the unit avoided prosecution for war crimes and made successful careers in West Germany.

Fifteen judicial proceedings relating to the unit were opened in West Germany, mostly relating to the deportation and murder of Slovak Jews. Only one man, Silvester Weiss, was ever indicted by a German court for crimes committed as part of the unit; he was born on 27 November 1925 in Slovakia and prosecuted under juvenile law in 1964. After being convicted for his role in the murder of a hostage, he was conditionally released and did not serve any time in prison. According to Czech historian Lenka Šindelářová, part of the failure to hold the perpetrators accountable was the lack of will on the part of German investigators, although the difficulty of obtaining evidence 20 years after the fact and statute of limitations also prevented cases from coming to trial. A few other members of Einsatzgruppe H were convicted as accomplices to murder for crimes committed with other units, but these sentences were typically light; one person was sentenced to six years in jail for the murder of 28,450 people. Heuser, responsible for Einsatzkommando 14's massacres, rose to a senior position in the West German police service before being convicted for assisting in the murder of 11,000 people in and around Minsk as a member of the Gestapo. He was released after serving six years of a 15-year sentence.

The topic of Einsatzgruppe H was understudied until the publication of Šindelářová's book, Finale der Vernichtung: die Einsatzgruppe H in der Slowakei 1944/1945 (End of the Extermination: the Einsatzgruppe H in Slovakia 1944/1945) in 2013. It was based on her dissertation at the University of Stuttgart.
