= Josef Witiska =

Austrian Nazi SS officer

Personal details
- Born: 5 July 1894 Iglau, Moravia, Austria-Hungary
- Died: 16 October 1946 (aged 52) Unknown
- Party: Nazi Party
- Education: Doctor of Law
- Profession: Lawyer; Police official

Military service
- Allegiance: Austria-Hungary; Austria; Nazi Germany
- Branch/service: Austro-Hungarian Army; Austrian Armed Forces; Schutzstaffel
- Years of service: 1914–1918; 1919–1920; 1938–1945
- Rank: Oberleutnant; SS-Standartenführer
- Commands: Local Commander, SiPo and SD, Galicia District; Commander, SiPo and SD, Slovakia; Führer, Einsatzgruppe H
- Battles/wars: World War I World War II
- Awards: Iron Cross, 2nd class War Merit Cross, 1st and 2nd class, with swords

Josef Witiska (5 July 1894 – 16 October 1946) was an Austrian lawyer and police official. After the 1938 Anschluss with Nazi Germany, he joined the Nazi Party and became a member of the Gestapo. While in the Gestapo leadership at Prague, he helped plan and execute the Lidice massacre. He participated in Holocaust-related mass murders during World War II in occupied Poland and in Slovakia where he commanded Einsatzgruppe H and rose to the rank of SS-Standartenführer. Taken into custody after the end of the war, he took his own life before he could be tried for his crimes.

== Early life in Austria ==
Witiska was born the son of a butcher at Iglau (today Jihlava) a German-speaking enclave on the Bohemian-Moravian border in what was then Austria-Hungary. He completed his schooling in the local Gymnasium and received his Abitur. In August 1914, he volunteered for the Austro-Hungarian Army and, from June 1915, participated in World War I. He was deployed to the Italian front and later became an aircraft observer with the rank of Oberleutnant. After the end of the war, he remained in the Austrian military until he was demobilized in April 1920. He began a police career in Vienna and also studied law, earning a Doctorate of Law in 1922. In December of that year, he was transferred to Graz in Styria. He rose through the ranks until May 1935, when he was appointed police commissioner of Graz.

== Career in Nazi Germany ==
At the time of the Anschluss of Austria with Nazi Germany in March 1938, Witiska joined the Schutzstaffel (SS number 422,296) and he also joined the Nazi Party in May 1938 (membership number 6,289,103). He was transferred to the Gestapo in Graz in April 1939 and was named a Regierungsrat (government councilor). In September 1942, Witiska was promoted to the rank of SS-Sturmbannführer and, in November 1942, to SS-Obersturmbannführer. In January 1945, he attained his final promotion, to SS-Standartenführer.

Following the invasion and conquest of Yugoslavia in April 1941, Witiska briefly served as deputy commander of the Gestapo at Maribor in German-occupied Slovenia. By June, he was assigned to the Gestapo headquarters in Prague where, a few months later, he became deputy commander. He was still in this post when the Deputy Reich Protector of the Protectorate of Bohemia and Moravia, Reinhard Heydrich, was assassinated in May 1942. Witiska participated in the meetings that planned and implemented the retaliatory massacre and destruction of the village of Lidice. In March 1943, Witiska was transferred to the General Government where he succeeded Helmut Tanzmann as the last local Kommandeur der Sicherheitspolizei und des SD (KdS) in the District of Galicia, headquartered in Lemberg (today Lviv). There Witiska was involved in the Nazi persecution and execution of Polish Jews.

From 10 September 1944, Witiska was deployed as commander of the newly-formed Einsatzgruppe H in German-occupied Slovakia. He also held the post of Befehlshaber der Sicherheitspolizei und des SD or BdS (Commander of the Security Police and SD) in Slovakia from 15 November 1944. Einsatzgruppe H and its local ally the Hlinka Guard militia carried out a massive deportation campaign against the Jews between September 1944 and March 1945 that resulted in over 14,000 Slovak Jews being transported via the Sereď concentration camp to the Auschwitz, Sachsenhausen and Ravensbrück extermination camps where most were murdered.

== Arrest and death ==
After the end of the war, Witiska fled westward and, after being arrested by the American forces, was held at an internment camp near Salzburg. In October 1946, he was extradited to Czechoslovakia but, while traveling by train en route to Plzeň, he reportedly poisoned himself and died before he could be brought to trial. Witiska was officially declared dead by the Graz Landesgericht (regional court) on 6 November 1947.

== See also ==
- List of Holocaust transports from Slovakia
- The Holocaust in Slovakia

== Sources ==
- Klee, Ernst (2007). Das Personenlexikon zum Dritten Reich. Wer war was vor und nach 1945. Frankfurt-am-Main: Fischer-Taschenbuch-Verlag. ISBN 978-3-596-16048-8.
- Pohl, Dieter (1997). Nationalsozialistische Judenverfolgung in Ostgalizien, 1941–1944. Oldenbourg: Walter de Gruyter. ISBN 978-3-486-56233-0.
- Šindelářová, Lenka (2013). "Einsatzgruppe H na povstaleckém Slovensku (1944–1945) a poválečné trestní stíhání" [Einsatzgruppe H in Uprising-era Slovakia (1944–1945) and Postwar Prosecution] (PDF). Soudobé dějiny (in Czech). XX (4): 582–603. doi:10.51134/sod.2013.039. ISSN 1210-7050.
- Šindelářová, Lenka (2013). Finale der Vernichtung: die Einsatzgruppe H in der Slowakei 1944/1945 (in German). Darmstadt: Wissenschaftliche Buchgesellschaft. ISBN 978-3-534-73733-8.
