= First mass transport of Jews to Auschwitz concentration camp =

1942 Holocaust transport

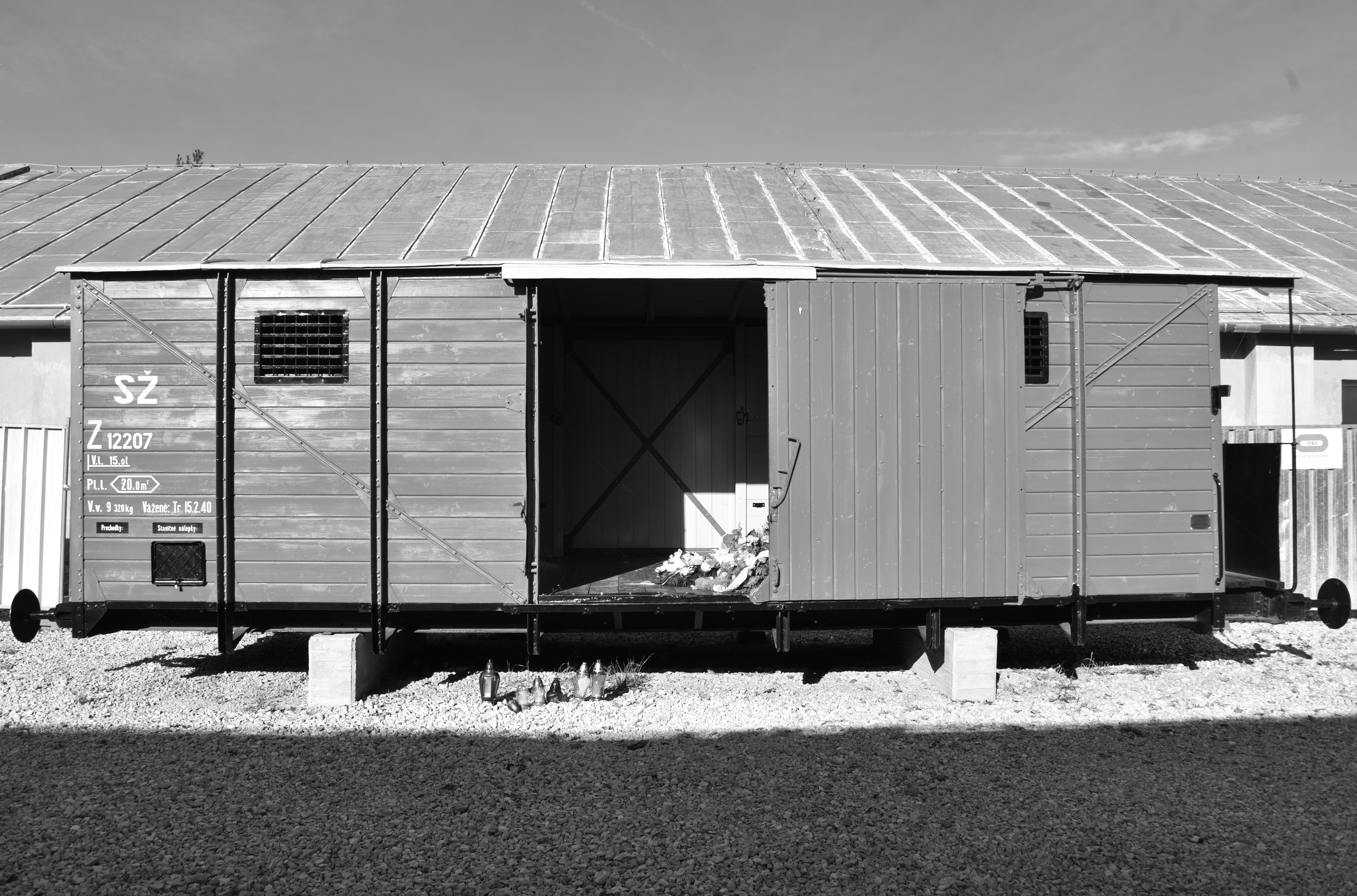
- Restored train car used to transport Slovak Jews. SŽ stands for Slovenské Železnice (Slovak Railways).
- Date: 25–26 March 1942
- Location: Slovak Republic, Auschwitz concentration camp
- Target: Slovak Jews
- Organised by: Slovak Republic, Nazi Germany
- Deportees: 997
- Survivors: 20

The first mass transport of Jews to Auschwitz concentration camp departed from Poprad transit camp in the Slovak Republic on 25 March 1942 and arrived at its destination on 26 March. It was the beginning of systematic deportation of Jews to Auschwitz concentration camp by the Reich Security Main Office and also the first transport of Jews from Slovakia.

== Background ==
Deportation was the natural outcome of the anti-Jewish measures imposed by the Axis-aligned Slovak Republic between 1939 and early 1942. The Jews had been forbidden to work without special permission and their businesses had been Aryanized, creating widespread poverty. In order to rid itself of this manufactured problem, Slovakia agreed with the German government to deport 20,000 Jews of working age to German-occupied Poland, paying Nazi Germany 500 Reichsmarks each (supposedly to cover the cost of resettlement). According to the agreement, seven thousand unmarried women were to be deported to Auschwitz concentration camp and thirteen thousand unmarried men were to be deported to Majdanek concentration camp.

Auschwitz was established in 1940. Its first victims were Soviet prisoners of war, Polish political prisoners, and some Jewish forced laborers at Schmelt Organization camps in East Upper Silesia who were no longer able to work. The gas chambers were first used in October 1941 on non-Jewish prisoners. The first transport of female prisoners arrived on 26 March 1942 (earlier the same day as the first transport of Jews) and consisted of 999 prisoners, mostly considered asocial, from Ravensbrück concentration camp. They were assigned to be kapos for the Jewish women and were noted for their brutal behavior.

== Transport ==
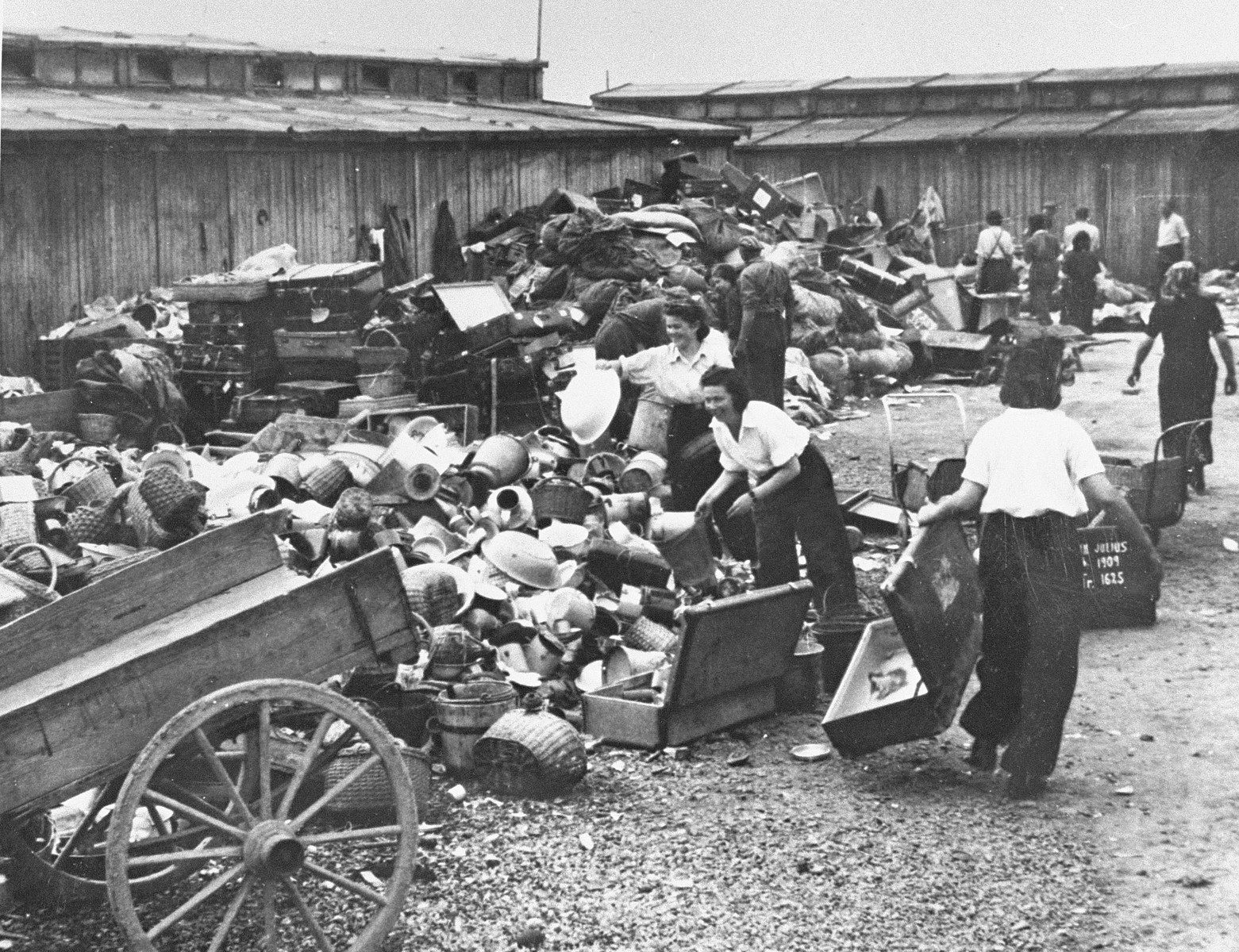
Linda Reich (center), deported on the first transport from Slovakia, and other prisoners sort belongings confiscated from Jews deported from Carpathian Ruthenia, 1944

News of upcoming deportations leaked on 3 March 1942, when many Jews visited the Jewish Center offices in Bratislava to confirm the rumors. The roundup of the women from towns and villages in the eastern Šariš-Zemplín region began on 21 March. In some areas town criers announced the deportation while the women were given only twenty-four hours to prepare in order to prevent them from evading deportation. Nevertheless, many women managed to avoid the roundup, although most of these were deported on later transports. Most of the deportees were working class and many came from Haredi (ultra-Orthodox) families. About half were between the ages of 16 and 21.

At Poprad transit camp the women were subjected to abuse and theft from the Slovak Hlinka Guard. Before the transport departed, the SS "Jewish adviser" for Slovakia, Dieter Wisliceny, addressed the deportees on the platform, saying that they would be allowed to return home after they finished the work that Germany had planned for them. The first deportees were unaware of what lay ahead and tried to be optimistic. According to survivors, songs in Hebrew and Slovak were sung as the transport left the platform. The transport left Poprad at 20:20 on 25 March and crossed the Slovak border near Skalité at 4:00 the next day, arriving at Auschwitz in the afternoon. Here they were deprived of the last of their possessions, stripped, shaved, and assigned numbers between 1,000 and 2,000.

It was the first mass transport of Jews to Auschwitz and the first to be organized by Adolf Eichmann's office, Referat IV B4. According to research by the American author Heather Dune Macadam, the Nazis intended to deport 999 Jewish women but their list contained duplicates, meaning that only 997 women were actually deported. Two sisters, both diabetic, committed suicide before the end of the first week at the camp.

== Aftermath ==
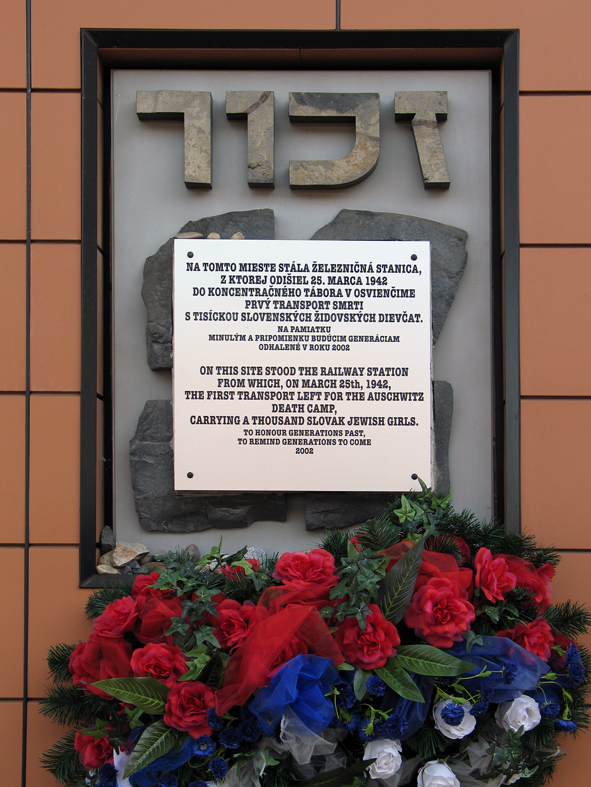
Plaque at Poprad train station commemorating the deportations

The transport of 25 March was the first of 57 transports that departed Slovakia in 1942, carrying away 57,628 Jews of whom only a few hundred returned. The deportation was retroactively legalized in May by Decree 68/1942. For three months, Slovak Jewish women from this and subsequent transports were the only Jewish women in Auschwitz.

Most of the women died of disease, selections, malnutrition, or other causes by the end of 1942. A few were able to secure privileged positions in administration, which allowed them to obtain the necessities for survival. According to testimonies, there were about 20 survivors from the transport. Rena Kornreich Gelissen, a survivor of the transport, coauthored a memoir with Macadam. Macadam later wrote a book on the transport as a whole, 999: The Extraordinary Young Women of the First Official Jewish Transport to Auschwitz (2019).

In 2002 a plaque was installed at Poprad train station to commemorate the deportation. In 2016 it was reported that every year, dozens of people congregate at the site to commemorate the event, including Pavol Mešťan, the director of the Jewish Museum of Culture. On the 75th anniversary (25 March 2017) President Andrej Kiska unveiled a plaque at the grammar school where the Jews were held temporarily before their deportation. He also met with the last surviving deportee, Edita Grosmanová, who died in August 2020.
