= Nemecká =

Nemecká Garamnémetfalva
- Municipality
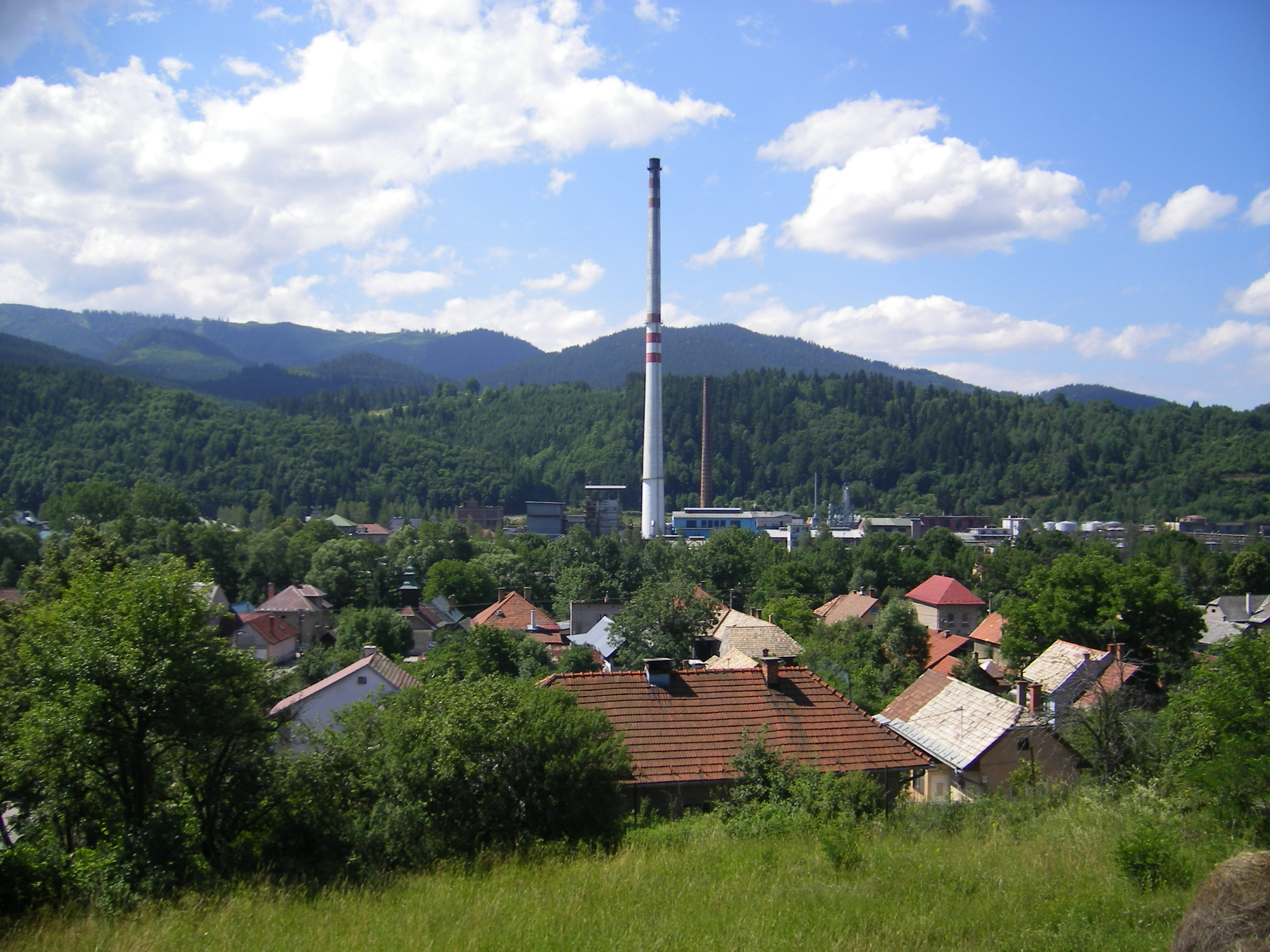

- Flag

- Location of Nemecká in the Banská Bystrica Region Location of Nemecká in Slovakia
- Coordinates: 48.82°N 19.42°E
- Country: Slovakia
- Region: Banská Bystrica Region
- District: Brezno District
- First mentioned: 1281

Government
  - Mayor: Branislav Čižmárik

Area
  - Total: 24.63 km^{2} (9.51 sq mi)
- Elevation: 425 m (1,394 ft)

Population (2025)
  - Total: 1,691
- Time zone: UTC+1 (CET)
  - Summer (DST): UTC+2 (CEST)
- Postal code: 976 97
- Area code: +421 48
- Vehicle registration plate (until 2022): BR
- Website: www.nemecka.info

Nemecká (German: Deutschendorf an der Gran; Hungarian: Garamnémetfalva) is a village and municipality in Brezno District, in the Banská Bystrica Region of central Slovakia. The name, which can be translated as "German village", suggests villagers, or part of them, being of German origin.

The first written mention of the village is from 1281. The villagers were mostly farmers and forest workers. Later, basic industries like limeworks, brickworks etc. developed in the area. From the 18th century on, many locals took part in door-to-door selling of laces, manufacturing of which also took place in the village.

The village was a site of German atrocities during World War II aimed to suppress Slovak National Uprising. As many as 900 people were executed and their bodies burned in local lime kiln. The killings took 7 days (January 4–11, 1945). Responsible for the killings were members of German Einsatzkommando 14 led by Obersturmfuhrer Kurt Herbert Deffner and members of Slovak regime's Hlinka Guard led by captain Vojtech Kosovsky. The victims were participants of the uprising, their families and people from "proscribed races", i.e. Roma and Jews.

A monument commemorating the massacre was built after World War II with a small exhibition opened to visitors all year long.

== Geography ==
The municipality lies at an altitude of 425 metres (1,394 ft) and covers an area of 24.63 km^{2} (9.51 sq mi) (2025).

== Population ==
Population statistic (10 years)
Year	1995	2005	2015	2025
Count	1722	1817	1809	1691
Difference		+5.51%	−0.44%	−6.52%

Population statistic
Year	2024	2025
Count	1691	1691
Difference		+0%

It has a population of 1691 people (31 December 2025).

=== Ethnicity ===
Census 2021 (1+ %)
Ethnicity	Number	Fraction
Slovak	1635	94.5%
Not found out	87	5.02%
Romani	26	1.5%
Total	1730	

In year 2021 was 1730 people by ethnicity 1635 as Slovak, 87 as Not found out, 26 as Romani, 9 as Czech, 5 as Other, 4 as German, 2 as Rusyn, 2 as Hungarian, 1 as Ukrainian, 1 as Russian and 1 as French.

Note on population: The difference values of population numbers in the table "Population statistic" and in the sections "Ethnicity" & "Religion" is caused by the use of various statistical methods.

=== Religion ===
Census 2021 (1+ %)
Religion	Number	Fraction
Roman Catholic Church	1121	64.8%
None	402	23.24%
Not found out	90	5.2%
Evangelical Church	45	2.6%
Christian Congregations in Slovakia	24	1.39%
Greek Catholic Church	18	1.04%
Total	1730	

In year 2021 was 1730 people by religion 1121 from Roman Catholic Church, 402 from None, 90 from Not found out, 45 from Evangelical Church, 24 from Christian Congregations in Slovakia, 18 from Greek Catholic Church, 7 from Eastern Orthodox Church, 6 from Other and not ascertained christian church, 6 from Ad hoc movements, 3 from Paganism and natural spirituality, 3 from Buddhism, 2 from United Methodist Church, 1 from Other, 1 from Hinduism and 1 from Apostolic Church.
