= Kremnička and Nemecká massacres =

1944-45 massacres in Kremnička and Nemecká, Slovakia

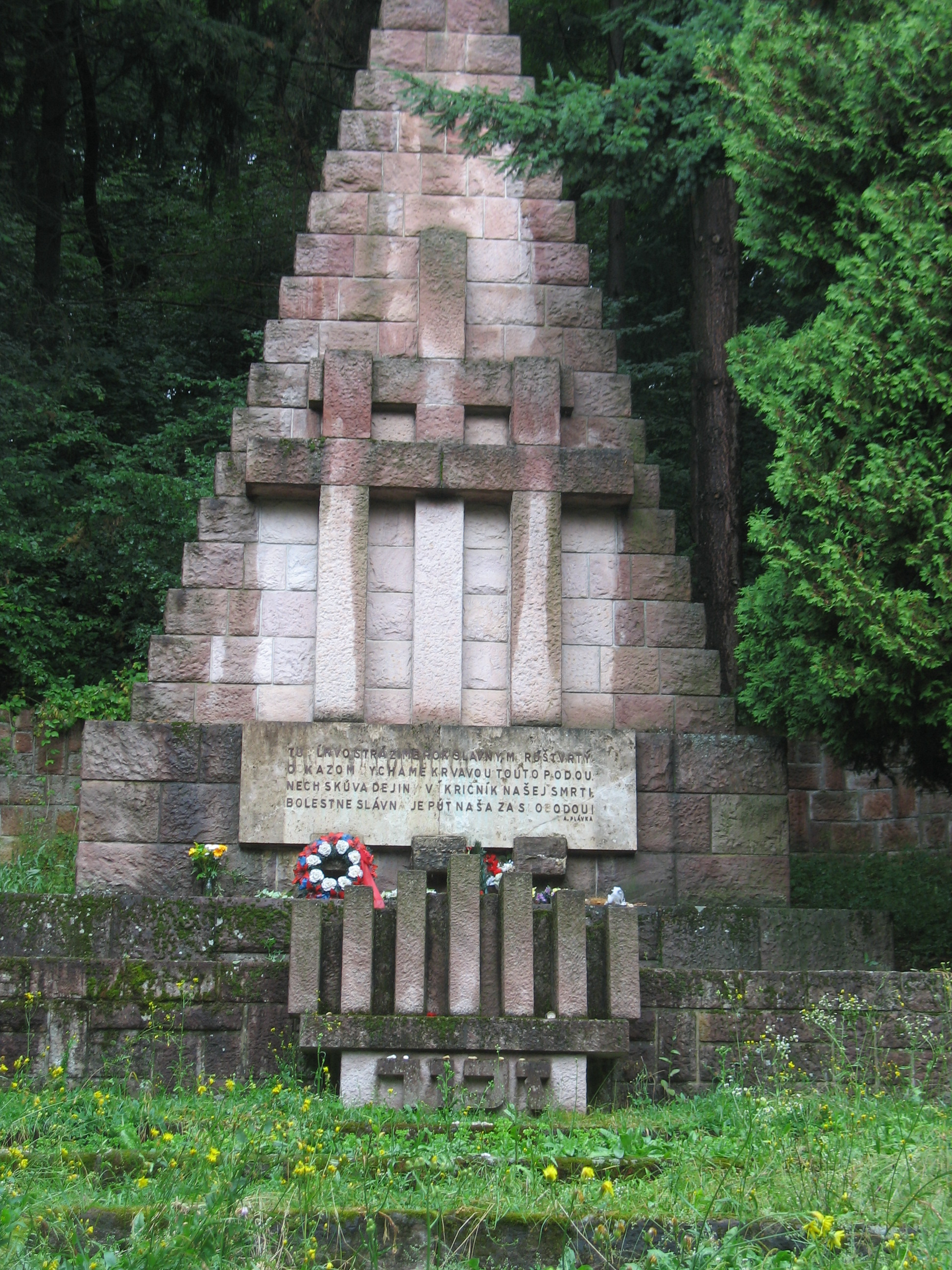
Memorial to the victims at Kremnička

The Kremnička and Nemecká massacres were a series of massacres committed between 5 November 1944 and 19 February 1945 in Kremnička and Nemecká, Slovakia by the Hlinka Guard Emergency Divisions and Einsatzkommando 14 following the suppression of the Slovak National Uprising. During the uprising, many Jews fled to Banská Bystrica, a partisan stronghold; when the town fell, Jews, actual or suspected Slovak partisans, and Romani people captured during roundups were temporarily held in the town's jail. The victims were then trucked to the murder sites at Kremnička and Nemecká, where they were shot. The majority of the 747 people shot at Kremnička were Jewish. Exact figures are not known for the Nemecká massacres, because the bodies were burned, but historians estimate a death toll of around 900, of whom most of the known victims were Jewish or Romani.

== Background ==
In response to increased activity of Slovak partisans who opposed Nazi Germany and the Axis-aligned Slovak government, Germany invaded Slovakia, precipitating the Slovak National Uprising, which broke out on 29 August 1944. Fearing a resumption of deportations to extermination camps, many Jews fled to Banská Bystrica, the center of the uprising, and other partisan-controlled areas in central Slovakia. The Germans and local collaborators—Hlinka Guard Emergency Divisions (POHG)—soon defeated the partisans and Slovak Army units which supported the uprising. When Banská Bystrica, the last opposition stronghold, fell on 27 October, Jews and Romani people as well as actual and suspected partisans were rounded up and held temporarily in an overcrowded prison with minimal food and water. Overall, about 4,000 people were murdered in Slovakia, mostly by Einsatzgruppe H, but with help from local collaborators.

== Massacres at Kremnička ==
Exhumed victims of the Kremnička massacre

Victims were placed in trucks and driven to Kremnička, where the partisans had dug anti-tank trenches. They were told to leave the trucks and were marched across a field to the trenches, where they were told to lie down. According to witnesses, the victims did not offer resistance. Both German and Slovak soldiers went through the rows of victims and shot them one by one. Other soldiers stood guard around the perimeter to make sure that no one escaped. After some had been killed, others jumped into the trenches among the dead, however the soldiers went through and shot them. Evidence collected upon exhumation determined that some were suffocated to death. There were massacres on 5 November, 20 November (282 victims), 12 and 19 December, 5 and 20 January, and 19 February.

Of the 747 victims, 211 were women and 58 were children; half were Jewish. Two of the victims, Haviva Reik and Rafi Reiss, were Jewish Parachutists of Mandate Palestine. Another well-known victim was the Slovak Jewish intellectual Alžbeta Göllnerová-Gwerková.

According to Slovak historian Anton Hruboň, about 5% of all members of the Emergency Divisions actually participated in massacres. However, Slovak collaborators who had been present at Kremnička frequently lied about their involvement in order to avoid prosecution, for example claiming that they had been threatened and coerced into participating in the massacre by German SD members and only shot over victims' heads. Other Slovak collaborators bragged about their murders, despite strict orders to keep the crimes confidential. Therefore, it is impossible to know the exact role that individual soldiers played in the massacre, but even those who did not shoot still contributed to the killings by guarding the perimeter and performing other auxiliary tasks.

== Massacres at Nemecká ==
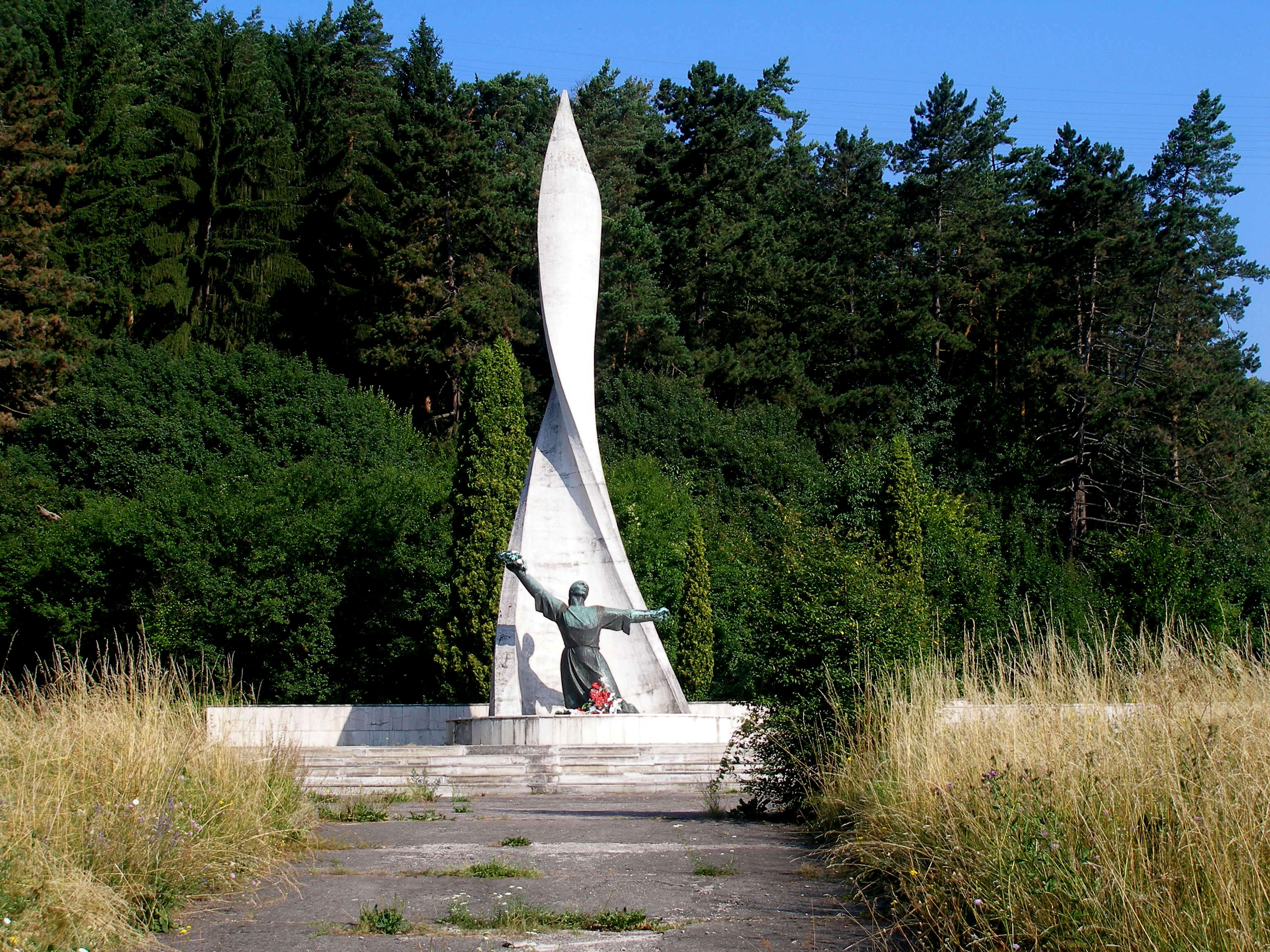
Memorial to the victims of the Slovak National Uprising in Nemecká

The nearby village of Nemecká was chosen as an execution site due to its limestone kilns, which were used to cremate the corpses. Victims were taken from the prison in Banská Bystrica in trucks and shot, before being burned. Because the bodies were burned, the exact number of victims is unknown but according to Israeli historian Gila Fatran, about 900 people were murdered. Einsatskommando 14's records indicate that 205 victims were "racially undesirable", 26 people were suspected of participating in the uprising, and a few of the victims were American, French, Soviet, and Romanian servicemen. The killings at Nemecká took place between 4 and 11 January 1945; both the Hlinka Guardsmen and Einsatzkommando 14 participated in the killings.

== Commemoration ==
The event has been described as the Slovak Katyn. Some Slovak commentators have focused on the fact that Slovak collaborators killed non-Jewish Slovak citizens. According to Fatran, the murders at Kremnička came to symbolize the brutality of the suppression of the uprising. Kremnička and Nemecká were the largest war crimes committed on Slovak soil during World War II. The Memorial of the Slovak National Uprising is located in Nemecká.
