= Nemčice =

Municipality in Slovakia

Nemčice Nyitranémeti
- Municipality
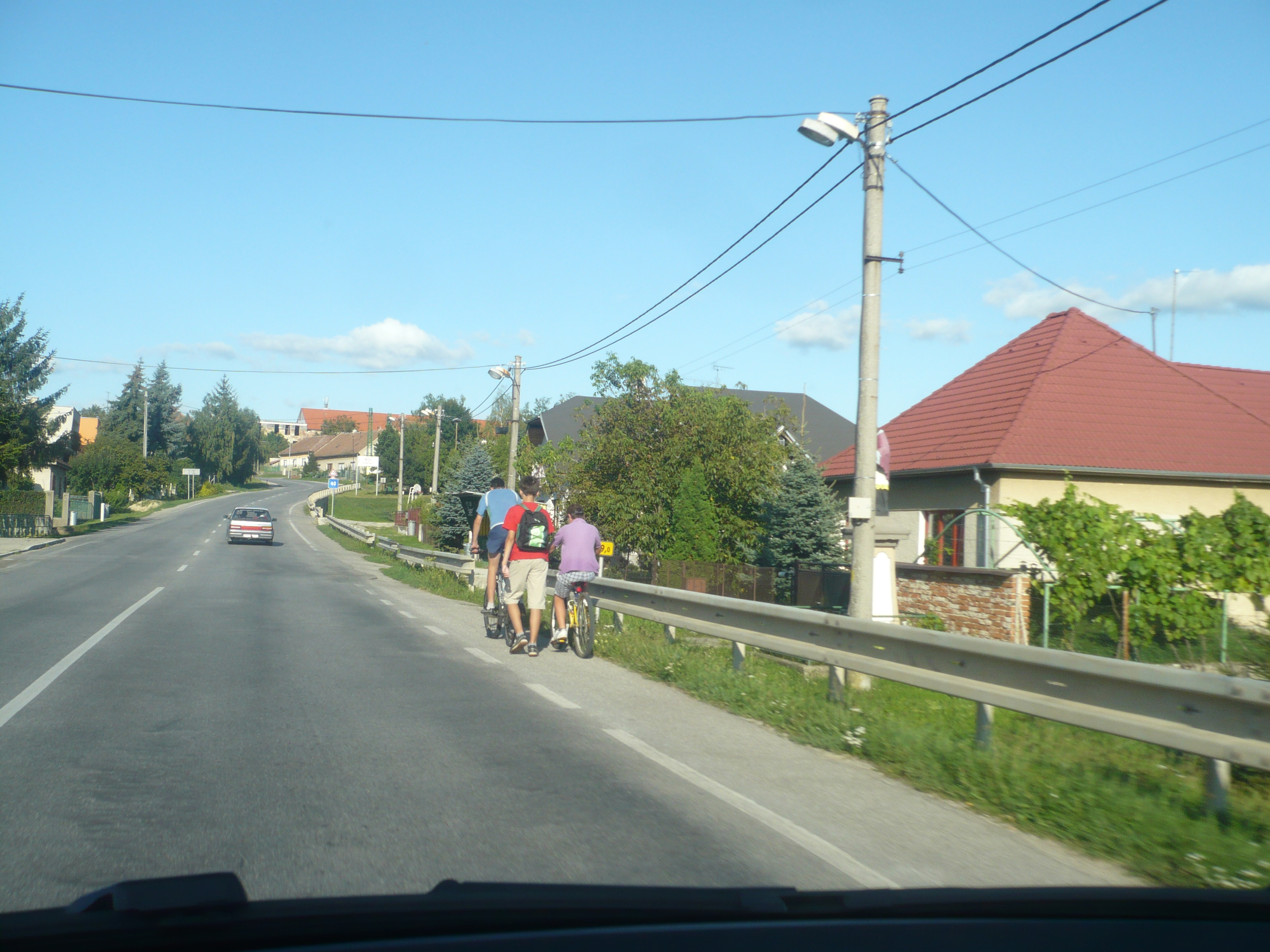
- Village view from the main road

- Flag

- Location of Nemčice in the Nitra Region Location of Nemčice in Slovakia
- Coordinates: 48.55°N 18.13°E
- Country: Slovakia
- Region: Nitra Region
- District: Topoľčany District
- First mentioned: 1156

Area
  - Total: 7.95 km^{2} (3.07 sq mi)
- Elevation: 176 m (577 ft)

Population (2025)
  - Total: 930
- Time zone: UTC+1 (CET)
  - Summer (DST): UTC+2 (CEST)
- Postal code: 955 01
- Area code: +421 38
- Vehicle registration plate (until 2022): TO
- Website: www.nemcice.sk

Nemčice (Hungarian: Nyitranémeti, until 1899 Nemcsicz) is a municipality in the Topoľčany District of the Nitra Region, Slovakia. In 2011 it had 977 inhabitants.

During World War II, the village was a site of mass killings of Jews and Roma. On September 11, 1944, 53 people were executed. The massacre was performed by German troops who had occupied Slovakia since August 29, 1944, when Slovak National Uprising began.

== Geography ==
The municipality lies at an altitude of 176 metres (577 ft) and covers an area of 7.95 km^{2} (3.07 sq mi) (2025).

== Population ==
Population statistic (10 years)
Year	1995	2005	2015	2025
Count	945	944	973	930
Difference		−0.10%	+3.07%	−4.41%

Population statistic
Year	2024	2025
Count	942	930
Difference		−1.27%

It has a population of 930 people (31 December 2025).

=== Ethnicity ===
Census 2021 (1+ %)
Ethnicity	Number	Fraction
Slovak	946	97.02%
Not found out	26	2.66%
Total	975	

In year 2021 was 975 people by ethnicity 946 as Slovak, 26 as Not found out, 2 as Czech, 2 as Russian, 2 as German, 2 as Canadian, 1 as Hungarian, 1 as Other and 1 as Croatian.

Note on population: The difference values of population numbers in the table "Population statistic" and in the sections "Ethnicity" & "Religion" is caused by the use of various statistical methods.

=== Religion ===
Census 2021 (1+ %)
Religion	Number	Fraction
Roman Catholic Church	770	78.97%
None	143	14.67%
Not found out	30	3.08%
Evangelical Church	12	1.23%
Christian Congregations in Slovakia	10	1.03%
Total	975	

In year 2021 was 975 people by religion 770 from Roman Catholic Church, 143 from None, 30 from Not found out, 12 from Evangelical Church, 10 from Christian Congregations in Slovakia, 4 from Ad hoc movements, 3 from Other, 1 from Old Catholic Church, 1 from Paganism and natural spirituality and 1 from Seventh-day Adventist Church.
