= Hlinka Guard Emergency Divisions =

- Pohotovostné oddiely Hlinkovej gardy
- Active: August 1944 – 1945
- Country: Slovak Republic
- Branch: Slovak Army
- Engagements: World War II: Slovak National Uprising; Bratislava–Brno offensive

The Hlinka Guard Emergency Divisions or Flying Squads of the Hlinka Guard (Slovak: Pohotovostné oddiely Hlinkovej gardy, POHG) were Slovak paramilitary formations set up to counter the August 1944 Slovak National Uprising. They are best known for the role they played in murdering Jews, Romani people, and actual or suspected Slovak partisans in conjunction with Einsatzgruppe H, especially for their participation in the Kremnička massacre.

== Formation ==
Many Slovak Army units and Slovak gendarmes sided with the rebels during the Slovak National Uprising. Relying on German troops to suppress the uprising was politically undesirable. Therefore, the Hlinka Guard, the paramilitary force of the clericofascist Slovak People's Party, was drafted to combat the partisans. President Jozef Tiso was an influential advocate of this, because he saw the Hlinka Guard as loyal to the Slovak Republic. Slovak fascist propaganda claimed that the uprising had been fomented by the Czech and Jewish minorities, considered "enemies of the state" because of their alleged support for Czechoslovakism and communism respectively. Although many Czechs and Jews had been expelled from Slovakia, some had been allowed to remain. Their deportation or murder was seen as an integral part of the suppression of the uprising, and the Hlinka Guard was the preferred tool for the Slovak Republic's racial persecutions.

The commander of the Hlinka Guard, Alexander Mach, accused moderate Hlinka Guardsmen of being too "soft" and allowing the uprising to occur. Other Hlinka Guardsmen accused Mach of being soft on the rebels, and he was removed from his position and replaced with Otomar Kubala. Because of doubts about the loyalty of certain elements of the Hlinka Guard, it was decided to create a new organization within the Hlinka Guard for the suppression of the uprising. POHG companies began to separate from the rest of the Hlinka Guard in early September, during the first weeks of the uprising. Its intended purpose was to restore the Axis Slovak Republic's control over central Slovakia in conjunction with German troops, and to persecute real and supposed enemies of the Slovak Republic. The Hlinka Guard had previously assaulted Jews in public during the first years of the regime, enriched itself through the process of "Aryanization" (confiscation of Jewish-owned businesses and property), and participated in the forcible roundups that sent two-thirds of Slovakia's Jews to death camps in 1942.

== Organization and personnel ==
Some of its personnel were previously members of the Hlinka Guard or Hlinka Youth, but many Hlinka Guardsmen refused to join the special companies. Hundreds of men volunteered, but many of these were motivated by economic reasons or to avoid being drafted into the regular army. Nevertheless, the manpower needs exceeded willing recruits, and Kubala authorized local commanders to draft eligible men, (Note: Prospective guardsmen had to be "politically reliable" and "morally reputable", of Slovak citizenship and nationality, and between the ages of 20 and 45. Commanders were also required to reject those who sought to avoid being conscripted into alternative service, or joined for purely financial reasons.) both Guardsmen and non-Guardsmen, as needed. A significant number who received these notices managed to evade the authorities or were imprisoned for refusing to serve. Under new regulations making the POHG legally part of the armed forces, those who refused to serve in it were subject to a 5,000 Slovak koruna fine and up to 3 months imprisonment. Deserters could be shot. Those who had participated in the uprising, even under threat of violence from partisans in partisan-controlled areas, were also forbidden to join, but in practice many did anyway and were even promoted to positions of responsibility within the POHG. The shortage of NCOs and officers was partially solved by drafting personnel from the regular Hlinka Guard into the POHG. Membership in the units did not necessarily correlate with sympathy for fascism, Nazism, or antisemitism. There was a high rate of desertion from the units during their short existence.

Originally, guards were paid 11.50 Ks per day, regardless of rank, paid out three times a month; later this became 1,500 Ks monthly for married men and 800 Ks for single men. Guardsmen often had to pay for food and uniforms out of pocket, but their employers were required to continue to pay them their previous salary (they were later compensated by the government) and forbidden to fire them after returning from active service in the POHG. POHG members were also entitled to additional food rations and cigarettes. Some POHG members wore their old Hlinka Guard uniforms, others had Slovak Army or even Wehrmacht uniforms despite strict regulations requiring them to have appropriate uniforms. They were distinguished by a special ribbon on the left sleeve. POHG members were frequently drunk, leading to quarrels with the regular army, German soldiers, and even the Slovak civilian authorities.

== Military actions ==
The initial actions of the POHG against the partisans were hampered by difficulty of communication with headquarters. Because of the danger of partisans intercepting messages—some Hlinka Guardsmen even joined the partisans, giving an opportunity for false flag operations—passwords were introduced and the POHG uniform was altered slightly. When communication with their superiors was not possible, local units collaborated closely with nearby German forces. Because the Germans did not trust them, the POHG mostly performed auxiliary military tasks during the suppression of the uprising, rather than frontline combat. When POHG units did confront the enemy directly, they often ran away; other POHG dragged their feet when ordered into contested territory, foiling German offensives.

The first unit to join the fighting, led by Štefan Rabin, did not begin to engage in combat until the end of September, when the suppression of the rebellion was already well underway. It only suffered the loss of 5 killed and 15 wounded, indicating that it was not involved in heavy fighting. This unit was also one of the most brutal in its treatment of captured Jews and partisans. The overall combat effectiveness of the POHG was limited; many of its personnel were middle-aged men with families, who took all opportunities to avoid danger. This tendency reduced morale among POHG units and led to tensions with German forces, who had to take on dangerous engagements without help. One POHG unit, training in the Bratislava area, rioted when it learned that it might be expected to fight against advancing Red Army forces; many of its members deserted despite the death penalty. Partisan groups often set ambushes and lured POHG units with anonymous tipoffs about Jews in hiding, a tactic that proved effective. German hopes of recruiting significant numbers of POHG men into the Waffen-SS for deployment on the approaching Eastern Front never materialized.

Slovak propaganda claimed the overall Hlinka Guard as superior to the regular armed forces, emphasizing the POHG's loyalty to the regime and glossing over their military failure. The Slovak Army's loyalty to the Slovak people was brought into question due to their support for the uprising, and it was accused of being a hotbed of "Bolshevism", which had no basis in fact.

== Criminality ==
About 5% of Emergency Divisions personnel committed war crimes. The POHG cooperated closely with Einsatzgruppe H, a Nazi German death squad created to murder or deport Slovakia's remaining Jews, during the entirety of its existence. Officially, captured partisans were the responsibility of the Germans, while gendarmes who joined the partisans and Jews were at the disposal of the POHG, but this distinction was often blurred in practice. Einstazgruppe H's intelligence personnel, in reports to their superiors, emphasized the help that the POHG provided during roundups of Jews for deportation to Auschwitz and other Nazi concentration camps. According to Czech historian Lenka Šindelářová, the success of Einsatzgruppe H was largely due to denunciations and the cooperation of the POHG guardsmen, who could impersonate partisans due to their local knowledge and ability to speak Slovak. POHG men participated in the massacres and aided with interrogations, as well as searching houses for Jews in hiding. Many members of the POHG refused to execute captured partisans, but few refused to murder or round up Jews.

Einsatzgruppe H took the initiative in many of the massacres of partisans, requiring POHG members to be present at executions. POHG executions of captured partisans were justified based on war crimes allegedly committed by partisans which were emphasized in fascist propaganda. On one occasion, the POHG summarily executed partisans who had previously been disarmed by the Sicherheitsdienst (SD), and the POHG also committed war crimes in concert with the Waffen-SS Galizen Division. However, some guards criticized the German practices of looting the local population and refused to participate in executions. Two POHG soldiers who had just joined a few days previously to avoid military service shot captured partisans at Ilava prison. Although Einsatzgruppe H complained that POHG members tried to save acquaintances who had been captured as partisans, some victims of POHG atrocities have become famous symbols of anti-fascism, especially Mirek Nešpor, who allegedly committed suicide after being tortured by the POHG at Vlčova Street in Bratislava.

On 1 September, the German authorities decided to use the POHG as the main means of implementing the Final Solution in Slovakia. There was little resistance within the POHG to murdering Jewish citizens; the Hlinka Guard had a history of committing anti-Jewish violence, and many guardsmen could not resist the opportunity to enrich themselves by stealing from murdered Jews. Kubala ordered that all property stolen from Jews be deposited in a special account in a Bratislava bank, but in practice most property was appropriated by the unit involved in the persecution of Jews. Corruption was so rampant that some POHG men were imprisoned for theft and special sections had to be formed for anti-Jewish persecutions to minimize the amount of Jewish property appropriated by individual guardsmen. There were several instances in which captured Jews were tortured in hopes of obtaining property that the Jews had allegedly hidden. Frequently, Jews were released if they could pay a bribe. One POHG man noticed a man of Jewish appearance in a Trenčín restaurant; despite the man's documents stating him to be a Catholic, the guardsman forced him to undress. Noticing that the man was circumcised, the guardsman extorted valuables before releasing him.

The Fifth Company of the POHG helped murder at least 282 people as part of the Kremnička massacre along with Einsatzkommando 14, a subunit of Einsatzgruppe H. The POHG also participated in the Nemecká massacre in January 1945; several hundred people were murdered.

Slovak collaborators who had been present at massacres frequently lied about their involvement in order to avoid prosecution, for example claiming that they had been threatened and coerced into participating in the massacre by German SD members and only shot over victims' heads. Other Slovak collaborators bragged about their murders, despite strict orders to keep the crimes confidential. Therefore, it is impossible to know the exact role that individual soldiers played in the massacre, but even those who did not shoot still contributed to the killings by guarding the perimeter and performing other auxiliary tasks.

== Liberation of Slovakia ==
During the Bratislava-Brno Offensive in which Slovakia was liberated by the Red Army, most POHG men remained home with their families and avoided fighting, despite an attempt at evacuation by Kubala. Of 5,867 men in active service in the POHG in the second half of March, only 1,600 evacuated as ordered. Some of these evacuees fought in Moravia or in Austria during later Red Army offensives. POHG members who made it far enough west to surrender to the United States Army participated in skirmishes with German forces that resisted surrender. Eventually, they were turned over to the Soviets, based on international agreements.

== Aftermath ==
Returning POHG members faced property confiscation, loss of civil rights, and imprisonment; most of the major leaders were executed for their role in war crimes. A few managed to remain in the West and went into exile. After the 1948 Communist coup, the amount of scrutiny lessened; most guards reintegrated into society. Some joined the Communist Party and obtained positions of influence in the new state. In 1958, fifteen POHG members were tried for their participation in the Kremnička and Nemecká massacres; five were sentenced to death. During the Communist era, the POHG were portrayed as loyal agents of the Nazi regime and their role in war crimes was emphasized in order to delegitimize the institutions of the Slovak Republic. Former members of the POHG were prosecuted for their membership in the organization; some were tortured and forced to give false confessions. At the same time, some anti-communists perceived the POHG as heroic forces fighting against communism and for Slovak nationalism, while glossing over the units' participation in war crimes. They continue to be the focus of far-right commemorations.
