= History of the Jews in Slovakia =

Slovak Jews Slovenskí Židia יהודים סלובקיים
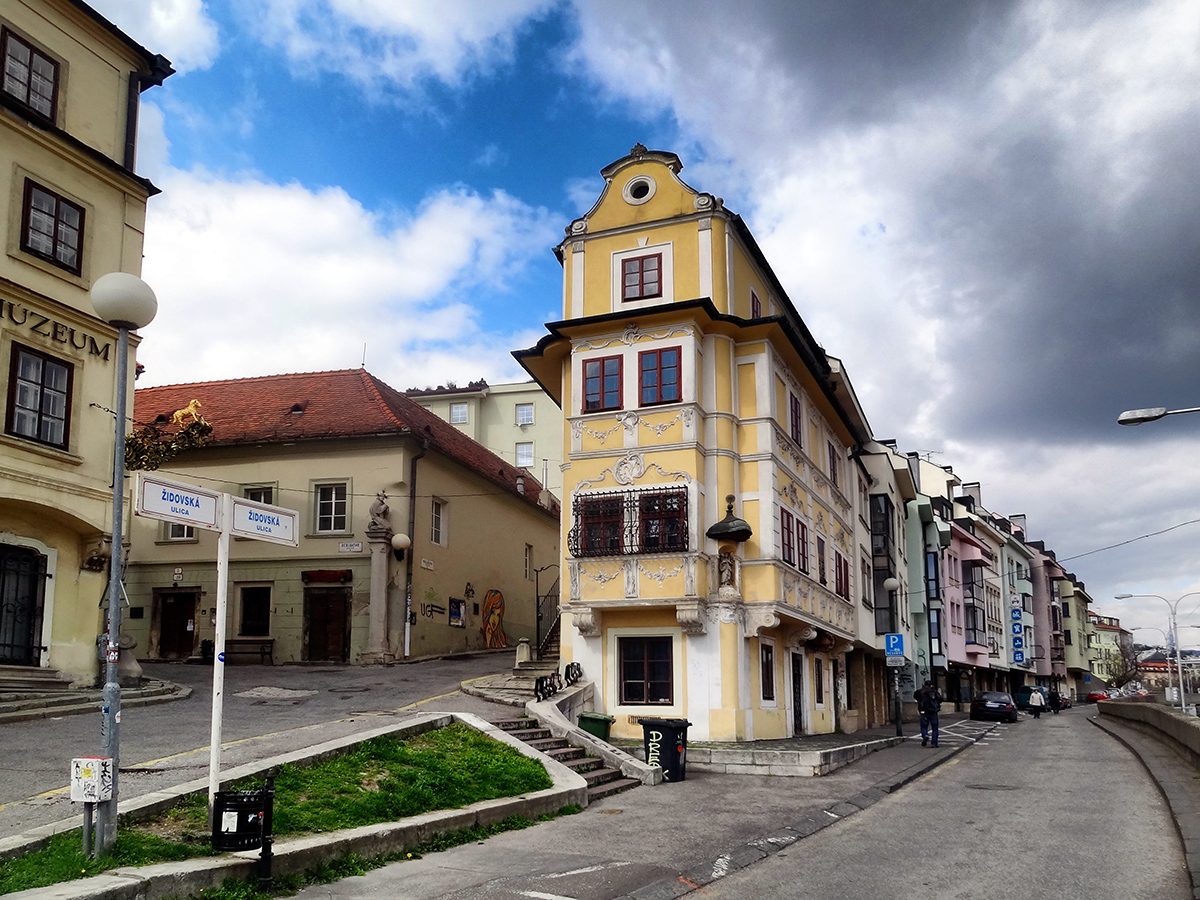
- Židovská Street, Bratislava

Total population
- 2,000

Languages
- Slovak, Hebrew, Yiddish

Religion
- Judaism

Related ethnic groups
- Ashkenazi Jews, Czech Jews, Czech diaspora in Israel

Historical Slovak Jewish population
Year	Pop.	±%
1921	135,918	—
1930	136,737	+0.6%
1950	7,476	−94.5%
1991	912	−87.8%
2001	2,310	+153.3%
2011	1,999	−13.5%
2021	2,007	+0.4%
Source: Data from Slovak and Czechoslovak censuses

The history of the Jews in Slovakia goes back to the 11th century, when the first Jews settled in the area.

== Early history ==
In the 14th century, about 800 Jews lived in Bratislava, the majority of them engaged in commerce and money lending. In the early 15th century, a Jewish cemetery was established at Tisinec and was in use until 1892.

In 1494, a blood libel caused sixteen Jews to be burned at the stake in Trnava, and in 1526, after the Battle of Mohács, Jews were expelled from all major towns. In 1529, thirty Jews were burned at the stake in Pezinok.

In the late 17th century and early 18th century, Jews began to return to their original cities and establish organized communities, though they were barred from many trading industries and often in conflict with non-Jews. In 1683, hundreds of Jews from Moravia fled to the Hungarian Kingdom, seeking refuge from Kuruc riots and restrictions on their living imposed in Moravia. In 1700, a leading yeshiva was established in Bratislava and recognized by the government. Under the enlightened absolutism of Joseph II, Jews received many additional civil liberties.

== 19th century ==
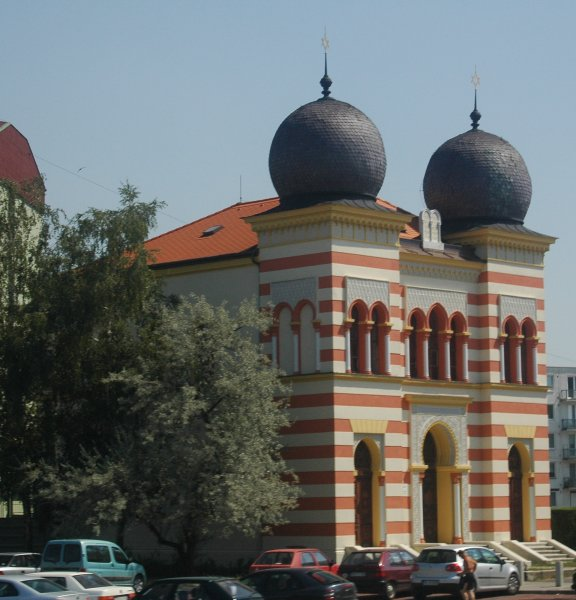
Synagogue in Malacky

Jewish communities emerged in the late eighteenth century following immigration from Bohemia, Moravia, Austria and Poland. The communities were affected by the schism in Hungarian Jewry in the mid-nineteenth century, eventually splitting into Orthodox (the majority), Status Quo, and more liberal Neolog factions. Following Jewish emancipation in 1867, many Jews had adopted Hungarian language and customs to advance in society. Many Jews moved to cities and joined the professions; others remained in the countryside, mostly working as artisans, merchants, and shopkeepers. Their multilingualism helped them advance in business, but put them in conflict with Slovak nationalism. The Slovak Jews were not as integrated as the Jews in Bohemia and Moravia, preferring a traditional lifestyle. Traditional religious antisemitism was joined by the stereotypical view of Jews as exploiters of poor Slovaks (economic antisemitism), and a form of "national anti-Semitism" that accused Jews of sympathizing with Hungarian and later Czechoslovak national aims.

== Interwar period ==
After World War I, Slovakia became part of the new country of Czechoslovakia. In both parts of the new republic, anti-Jewish riots broke out in the aftermath of the declaration of independence (1918–1920), although the violence was not nearly as serious as in Ukraine or Poland. Blood libel accusations occurred in Trenčin and in Šalavský Gemer in the 1920s. In the 1930s, the Great Depression affected Jewish businessmen and also increased economic antisemitism. Economic underdevelopment and perceptions of discrimination in Slovak part of Czechoslovakia led a plurality (about one-third) of Slovaks to support the conservative pro-catholic and anti-semitic, ethnonationalist Slovak People's Party (Slovak: Hlinkova slovenská ľudová strana: HSĽS). HSĽS viewed minority groups such as Czechs, Hungarians, Jews, and Romani people as a destructive influence on the Slovak nation, and presented Slovak autonomy as the solution to Slovakia's problems. The party began to emphasize antisemitism during the late 1930s following a wave of Jewish refugees from Austria in 1938 and anti-Jewish laws passed by Hungary, Poland, and Romania.

In the 1930s, antisemitic rioting and demonstrations broke out, incited by the Slovak People's Party. During the rioting, professional Jewish boxers and wrestlers took to the streets to defend their neighborhoods from antisemitic gangs, and one of them, Imi Lichtenfeld, would later use his experiences to develop Krav Maga.

== The Holocaust ==
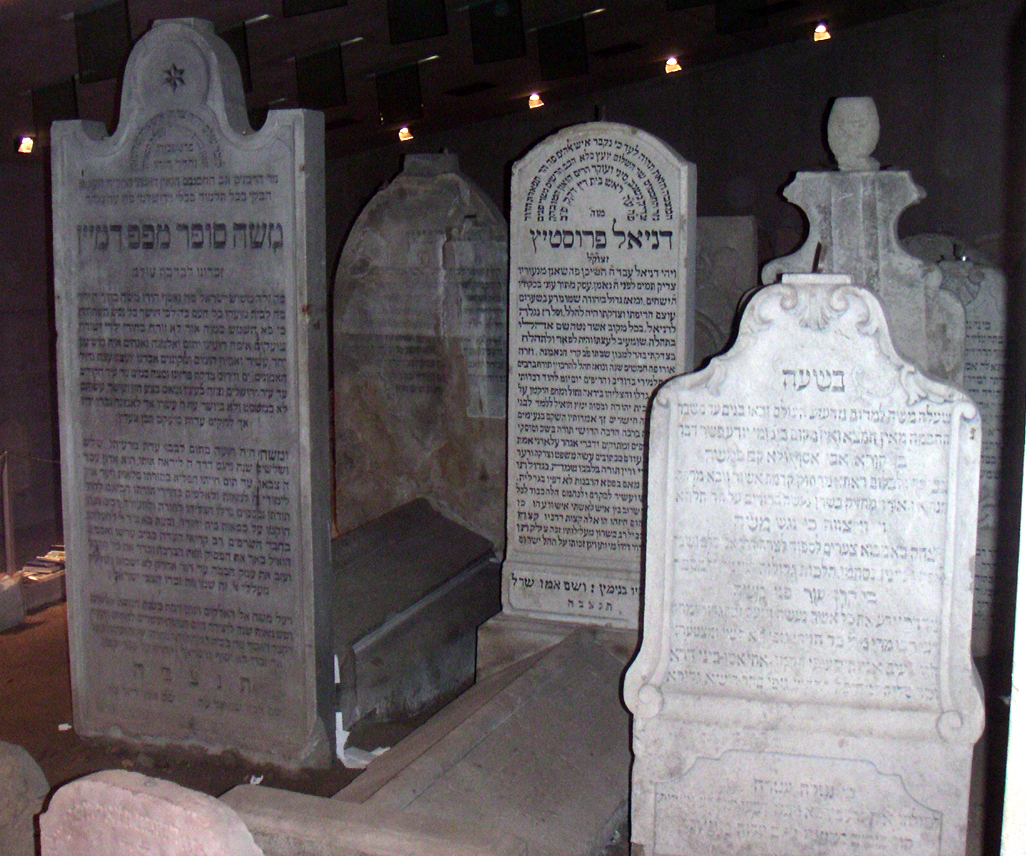
Interior of the Jewish memorial in Bratislava, Slovakia (with the grave of the rabbi Chatam Sofer at the left). The Jewish cemetery in Bratislava was desecrated during the Holocaust.

Some 5,000 Jews emigrated before the outbreak of World War II and several thousands afterwards (mostly to the British Mandate of Palestine), but most were killed in the Holocaust. After the Slovak Republic proclaimed its independence in March 1939 under the protection of Nazi Germany, the pro-Nazi regime of President Jozef Tiso, a Catholic priest, began a series of measures aimed against the Jews in the country, first excluding them from the military and government positions. The Hlinka Guard began to attack Jews, and the "Jewish Code" was passed in September 1941. Resembling the Nuremberg Laws, the Code required that Jews wear a yellow armband and were banned from intermarriage and many jobs. By 1940, more than 6,000 Jews had emigrated. By October 1941, 15,000 Jews were expelled from Bratislava; many were sent to labor camps, including Sereď.

Originally, the Slovak government tried to make a deal with Germany in October 1941 to deport its Jews as a substitute for providing Slovak workers to help the war effort. The initial terms were for 20,000 young men aged 16 and older for forced labour, but the Slovak government was concerned that it would leave many aged, sick, or child Jews who would become a burden on the gentile population. A deal was reached where the Slovak Republic would pay 500 Reichsmark for each Jew deported, and in return, the Germans would deport entire families and promise that the Jews would never return. This was billed as a humanitarian measure that would keep Jewish families together; (Note: In reality, the Germans segregated the arrivals, and those unable to work were soon murdered.) the Slovak fascist authorities claimed that they did not know that the Germans were systematically exterminating the Jews under its control. Some Jews were exempt from deportation, including those who had converted before 1939.

The deportations of Jews from Slovakia started on March 25, 1942. (Note: The first transport was made up solely of 999 young women; it was also the first mass transport of Jews to Auschwitz) Transports were halted on October 20, 1942. A group of Jewish activists known as the Working Group tried to stop the process through a mix of bribery and negotiation. However, some 58,000 Jews had already been deported by October 1942, mostly to the Operation Reinhard death camps in the General Government in occupied Poland and to Auschwitz. More than 99% of the Jews deported from Slovakia in 1942 were murdered in the concentration death camps.

Jewish deportations resumed on September 30, 1944, after German troops occupied the Slovak territory to defeat the Slovak National uprising. During the German occupation, up to 13,500 Slovak Jews were deported (mostly to Auschwitz where most of them were gassed upon arrival), principally through the Jewish transit camp in Sereď under the command of Alois Brunner, and about 2,000 were murdered in the Slovak territory by members of the Einsatzgruppe H and the Hlinka Guard Emergency Divisions. Deportations continued until March 31, 1945, when the last group of Jewish prisoners was taken from Sereď to the Terezín ghetto. In all, German and Slovak authorities deported about 71,500 Jews from Slovakia; about 65,000 of them were murdered or died in concentration camps. The overall figures are inexact, partly because many Jews did not identify themselves, but one 2006 estimate is that approximately 105,000 Slovak Jews, or 77% of their prewar population, died during the war.

== After World War II ==
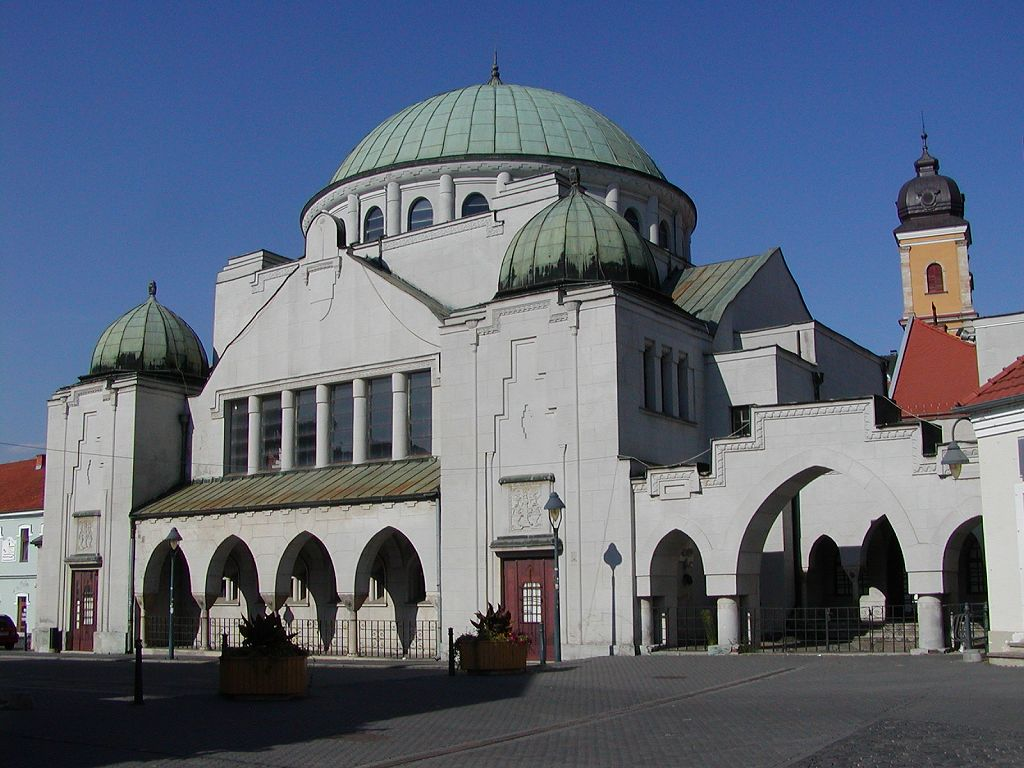
Synagogue in Trenčín

11 Jews were murdered by an unidentified UPA group in September 1945 in Kolbasov.

In the Topoľčany pogrom 48 Jews were seriously injured. 13 anti-Jewish incidents called partisan pogroms took place between August 1 and 5, 1946, the biggest one in Žilina, where 15 people were wounded. Antisemitic manifestations took place in Bratislava in August 1946 and in August 1948.

In 1946, the Slovak writer Karel František Koch argued that the antisemitic incidents that he witnessed in Bratislava after the war were "not antisemitism, but something far worse—the robber’s anxiety that he might have to return Jewish property [stolen in the Holocaust]," a view that has been endorsed by Czech-Slovak scholar Robert Pynsent.

After the war, the number of Jews in Slovakia was estimated to be up to 31,000. Most of them decided to emigrate. In February 1948, Communist rule was established after the 1948 Czechoslovak coup d'état. It lasted until November 1989 Velvet Revolution. During those years, little or no Jewish life existed. Many Jews emigrated to Israel or the United States to regain their freedom of religion. After 1989, and with the peaceful breakup of Czechoslovakia and Slovak independence in 1993, there was some resurgence in Jewish life. However, most Jews were elderly, and younger ones largely assimilated through intermarriage.

According to the 2021 census of Slovakia, the religious Jewish community had 2,007 members, which is about 0.04% of the total population of Slovakia. However, this does not account for those that are not practicing and non-religious Jews, or Jews by descent (full or partial). About 839 of them live in Bratislava Region (0.12% of the total population), followed by 311 members in Košice and 210 members in Trnava Region (both: 0.04%). The active Jewish population increased by 8 members since the 2011 census.

== See also ==
- History of the Jews in Bratislava
- Oberlander Jews
- History of the Jews in Carpathian Ruthenia
- History of the Jews in the Czech Republic
- Stolpersteine in the Banská Bystrica Region
- Stolpersteine in the Trnava Region
- Religion in Slovakia
- Judeo-Czech language

== Bibliography ==
- Bútorová, Zora; Bútora, Martin (August 1992). "Wariness Towards Jews as an Expression of Post-Communist Panic: The Case of Slovakia". Czechoslovak Sociological Review. 28: 92–106. JSTOR 41133197.

Deák, István (2015) [2013]. Europe on Trial: The Story of Collaboration, Resistance, and Retribution during World War II. Boulder, Colorado: Westview Press (Routledge). ISBN 978-0-8133-4790-5.

- Heitlinger, Alena (2011). In the Shadows of the Holocaust and Communism: Czech and Slovak Jews Since 1945. New Brunswick: Transaction. ISBN 978-1-4128-0927-6.
- Hutzelmann, Barbara (2018). "Einführung: Slowakei" [Introduction: Slovakia]. In Hutzelmann, Barbara; Hausleitner, Mariana; Hazan, Souzana (eds.). Slowakei, Rumänien und Bulgarien [Slovakia, Romania, and Bulgaria]. Die Verfolgung und Ermordung der europäischen Juden durch das nationalsozialistische Deutschland 1933-1945 [The Persecution and Murder of European Jews by Nazi Germany 1933-1945] (in German). Vol. 13. Munich: De Gruyter. pp. 18–45. ISBN 978-3-11-049520-1.
- Jelinek, Yeshayahu A. (1989). "Slovaks and the holocaust: Attempts at reconciliation". Soviet Jewish Affairs. 19 (1): 57–68. doi:10.1080/13501678908577626.
- Klein-Pejšová, Rebekah (2015). Mapping Jewish Loyalties in Interwar Slovakia. Bloomington: Indiana University Press. ISBN 978-0-253-01562-4.
- Klein-Pejšová, Rebekah (2009). "'Abandon Your Role as Exponents of the Magyars': Contested Jewish Loyalty in Interwar (Czecho)Slovakia". AJS Review. 33 (2): 341–62. doi:10.1017/S0364009409990043. S2CID 159825448.
- Koch, Karel František (1946). Slovo má lidskost. Prague: Vladimír Žikeš.
- Kulka, Erich (1989). "The Jews in Czechoslovakia between 1918 and 1968". In Stone, Norman; Strouhal, Eduard (eds.). Czechoslovakia: Crossroads and Crises, 1918–88. pp. 271–96. doi:10.1007/978-1-349-10644-8_15. ISBN 978-1-349-10646-2.

Láníček, Jan (2013). Czechs, Slovaks and the Jews, 1938–48: Beyond Idealisation and Condemnation. New York: Springer. ISBN 978-1-137-31747-6.
Lônčíková, Michala (2017). "Was the antisemitic propaganda a catalyst for tensions in the Slovak-Jewish relations?". Holocaust Studies. 23 (1–2): 76–98. doi:10.1080/17504902.2016.1209839. S2CID 151817674.
Lorman, Thomas (2019). The Making of the Slovak People's Party: Religion, Nationalism and the Culture War in Early 20th-Century Europe. London: Bloomsbury Publishing. ISBN 978-1-350-10938-4.
Nižňanský, Eduard (2014). "On Relations between the Slovak Majority and Jewish Minority During World War II". Yad Vashem Studies. 42 (2): 47–90. ISSN 0084-3296.
Paulovičová, Nina (2018). "Holocaust Memory and Antisemitism in Slovakia: The Postwar Era to the Present". Antisemitism Studies. 2 (1). Indiana University Press: 4–34. doi:10.2979/antistud.2.1.02. S2CID 165383570.

- Pynsent, Robert B. [in Czech] (July 18, 2013). "Conclusory Essay: Activists, Jews, The Little Czech Man, and Germans" (PDF). Central Europe. 5 (2): 211–333. doi:10.1179/174582107x190906. S2CID 144749278.
- Rajcan, Vanda; Vadkerty, Madeline; Hlavinka, Ján (2018). "Slovakia". In Megargee, Geoffrey P.; White, Joseph R.; Hecker, Mel (eds.). Camps and Ghettos under European Regimes Aligned with Nazi Germany. Encyclopedia of Camps and Ghettos. Vol. 3. Bloomington: United States Holocaust Memorial Museum. pp. 842–852. ISBN 978-0-253-02373-5.

Ward, James Mace (2015). "The 1938 First Vienna Award and the Holocaust in Slovakia". Holocaust and Genocide Studies. 29 (1): 76–108. doi:10.1093/hgs/dcv004. ISSN 8756-6583.

- Borský, Maroš. Synagogue Architecture in Slovakia Towards Creating a Memorial Landscape of Lost Community (PDF) (PhD thesis). Center for Jewish Studies Heidelberg.
- Szabó, Miloslav (2012). ""Because words are not deeds". Antisemitic Practice and Nationality Policies in Upper Hungary around 1900". Quest. Issues in Contemporary Jewish History (3).
