= Finale der Vernichtung =

2013 book by Lenka Šindelářová

German edition

Finale der Vernichtung. Die Einsatzgruppe H in der Slowakei 1944/1945 ("End of the Extermination: Einsatzgruppe H in Slovakia 1944/1945") (2013) is a book by Czech historian Lenka Šindelářová based on her doctoral thesis at the University of Stuttgart. It was also published in Czech as Einsatzgruppe H: působení operační skupiny H na Slovensku 1944/1945 a poválečné trestní stíhání jejích příslušníků (2015).
