= Sereď concentration camp =

Nazi labor and concentration camp for Jews in Slovakia during World War II

Sereď
- Concentration camp
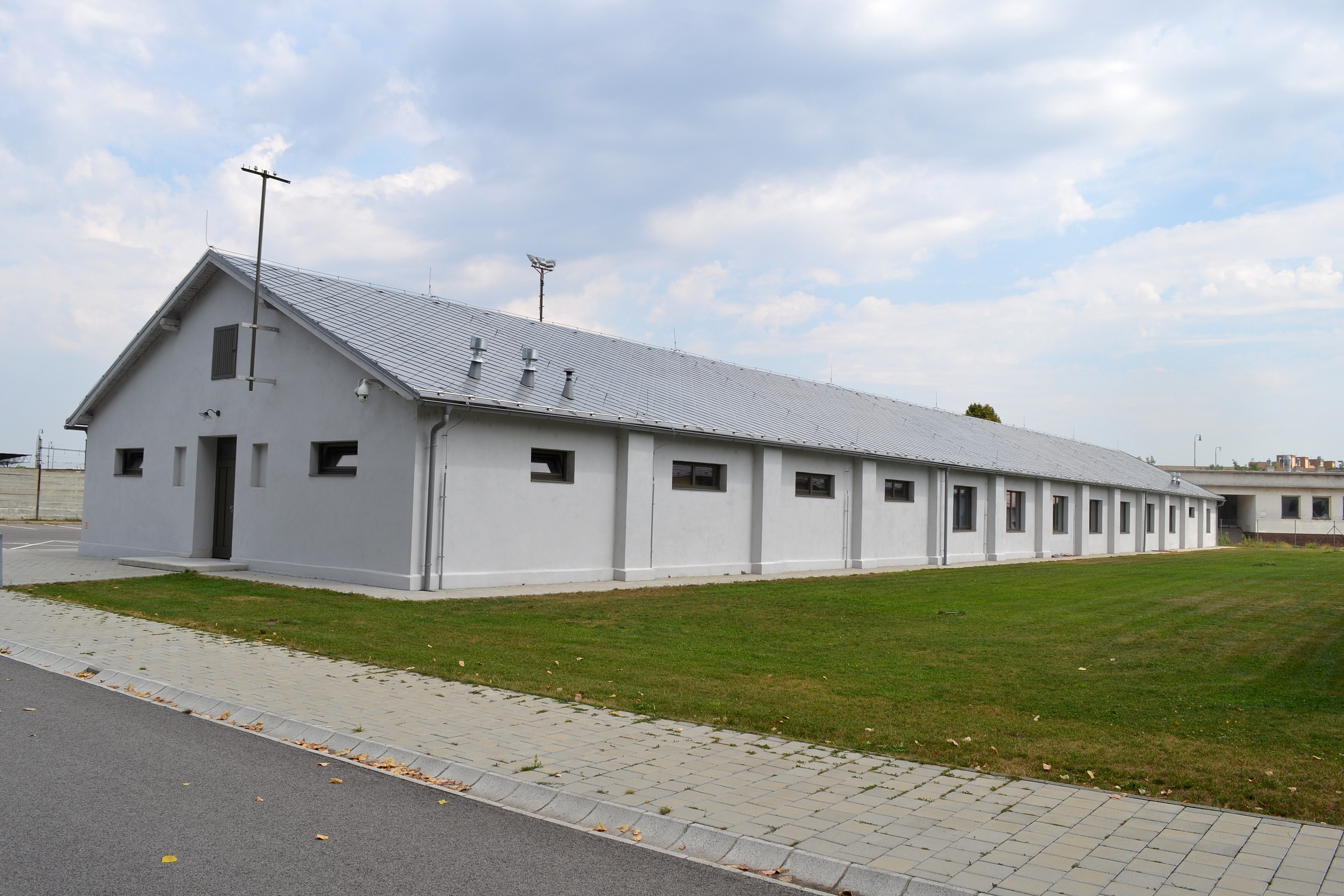
- Barracks at Sereď

- Location within Slovakia
- Coordinates: 48°17′20″N 17°43′29″E
- Location: Sereď, Slovakia
- Operated by: Hlinka Guard, Slovak Republic, SS
- Operational: September 1941–31 March 1945
- Inmates: Slovak Jews
- Number of inmates: 4,463 deported
- Liberated by: Red Army

Sereď was a Concentration and transit camp built during World War II in the Slovak Republic. It was founded as a labor camp for the Jewish population in September 1941. In September 1944, it was taken over by units of the SS.

== History ==
=== Labour camp ("the first Sereď") ===
Government Decree no. 198/1941, dated 9 September 1941, concerned the legal status of Jews. Known also as "The Jewish Codex", the order stripped all human and civil rights of the Jewish population in the Slovak Republic. According to the decree, Jews aged 16-60 were obliged to do work as ordered by the Slovak Ministry of the Interior. Within a month of the decree's enactment, the Ministry founded an internment camp and labor camp for the Jews in Sereď.

The camp consisted of several manufactories, which produced joinery products, toys, clothing, and other goods. It was guarded by the Hlinka Guard, and from March 1944 by the Slovak gendarmerie. During the first wave of deportations from Slovakia, the camp served as a temporary detention center for deported citizens.

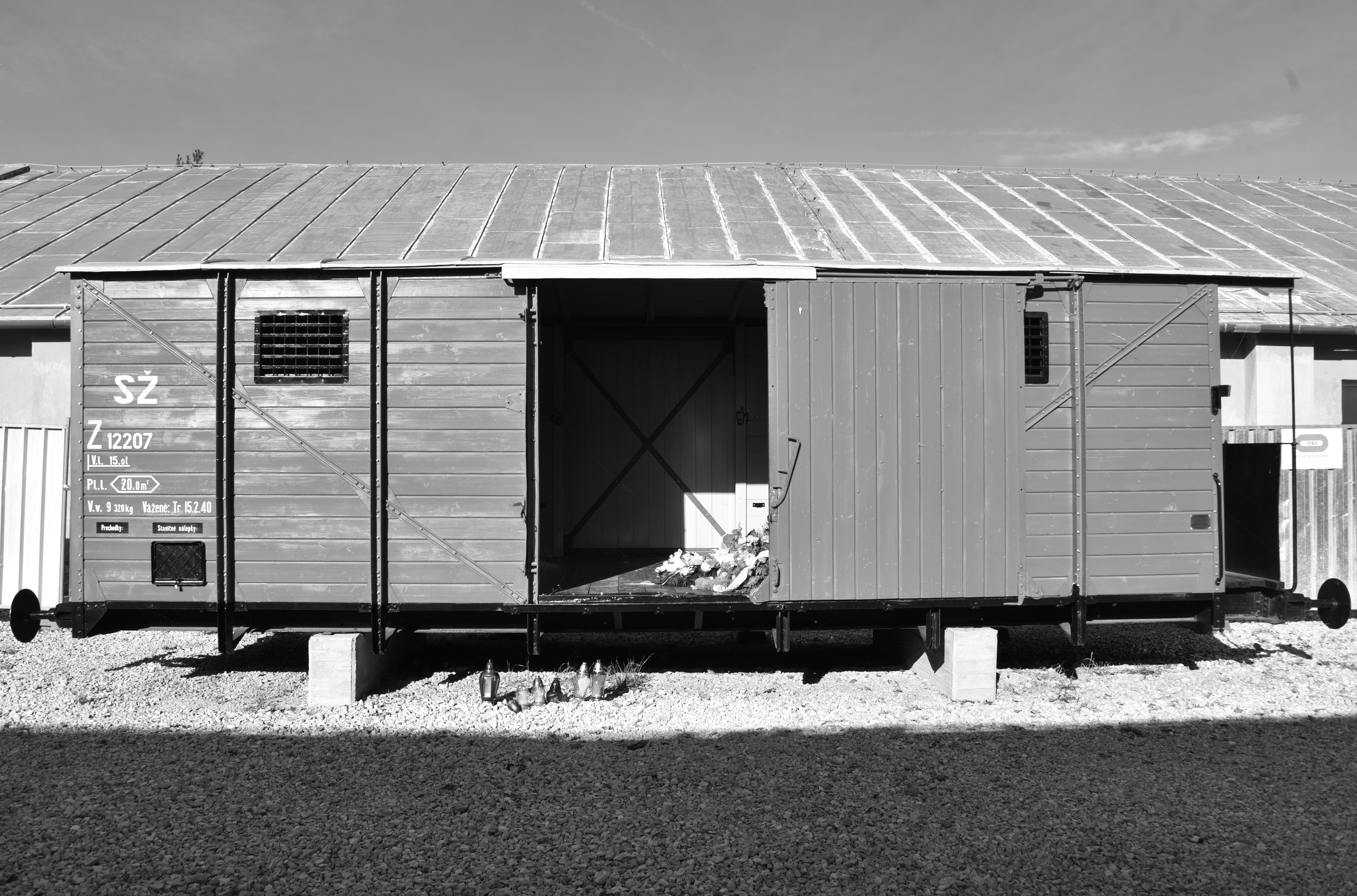
Freight car used to deport Slovak Jews

In total, 4,463 people were deported from Sereď to other Nazi forced labour camps in occupied Poland; most did not survive. The last two transport trains to leave Sereď during this time carried patients from the local Jewish hospital, as well as physically and mentally disabled people from various medical institutes. After this transport departed, conditions in the camp became better. In this later phase, Sereď was guarded by local police, who opened the gates and let the remaining Jews escape after the beginning of the Slovak National Uprising. Many prisoners ended up participating in the revolt.

=== Concentration camp ("the second Sereď") ===
In September 1944, Sereď was transformed into a concentration camp with an SS guard under the command of Bratislava German Franz Knollmayer. The new contingent of SS soldiers proceeded to commit major atrocities against the prisoners, including torture, rape (though this was frowned on as a violation of racial hygiene laws), and murder. By the end of September, Knollmayer had been replaced by Alois Brunner, who had a mandate to finally resolve the "Jewish question" in Slovakia.

Sereď became the main concentration camp for a second wave of deportations. In separate parts of the camp were imprisoned soldiers of the Slovak insurrectionist army, partisans, and people accused of supporting the uprising. Brunner organized 11 train transports, which deported prisoners to Auschwitz, Sachsenhausen, Ravensbrück, and Theresienstadt. The last transport left Sereď on 31 March 1945, shortly before its liberation by the Red Army.

== Legacy ==
=== Sereď Holocaust Museum ===
The labour and concentration camps in Sereď form a national cultural monument of the Slovak Republic. It is the only preserved camp complex of its kind in Slovakia (Nováky and Vyhne were not preserved). The Sereď Holocaust Museum located in the camp contains exhibits related to Jewish culture, life in the camp, and the Holocaust.

== Bibliography ==
- Beránek, Matej (2016). "Pracovný a koncentračný tábor v Seredi". Historická revue (in Slovak). 3.
- Konečný, Martin (2016). "Alois Brunner a jeho úloha v procese likvidácie európskych Židov". Historická revue (in Slovak). 3.
