= Slovak Republic (1939–1945) =

Client state of Nazi Germany

Slovak State (March 1939 – July 1939) Slovenský štát Slovak Republic (July 1939 – April 1945) Slovenská republika
- 1939–1945
- Flag Coat of arms
- Motto: Verní sebe, svorne napred! (English: "Faithful to Ourselves, Together Ahead!")
- Anthem: Hej, Slováci (English: "Hey, Slovaks")
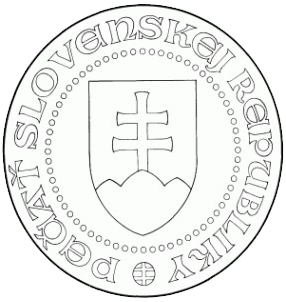
- National seal

- The Slovak Republic in 1942
- Status: Client state of Nazi Germany and member of the Axis (Note: Views differ on Slovakia's relation to Germany. István Deák writes, "Despite the claims of some historians, [Slovakia] functioned not as a puppet state but as Nazi Germany's first but not last Slavic-speaking military ally". Tatjana Tönsmeyer, who maintains that the puppet-state narrative overstates German influence and understates Slovakia's autonomy, notes that Slovak authorities frequently avoided implementing measures pushed by the Germans when such measures did not suit Slovak priorities. According to German historian Barbara Hutzelmann, "Although the country was not independent, in the full sense of the word, it would be too simplistic to see this German-protected state (Schutzstaat) simply as a 'puppet regime'." Ivan Kamenec, however, emphasizes German influence on Slovak internal and external politics and describes it as a "German satellite".)
- Capital and largest city: Bratislava; 48°09′N 17°07′E
- Official languages: Slovak
- Ethnic groups: 85% Slovaks; 128,000 Germans; 89,000 Jews (Note: According to the 1930 census Slovakia had 136,737 Jewish people.); 65,000 Hungarians; 30,000 Czechs
- Religion: Roman Catholicism (official religion)
- Demonym: Slovak
- Government: One-party state
- President
  - 1939–1945: Jozef Tiso
- Prime Minister
  - 1939: Jozef Tiso
  - 1939–1944: Vojtech Tuka
  - 1944–1945: Štefan Tiso
- Legislature: National Assembly
- History
  - Independence: 14 March 1939
  - War with Hungary: 23–31 March 1939
  - Constitution adopted: 21 July 1939
  - Invasion of Poland: 1–16 September 1939
  - Salzburg Conference: 28 July 1940
  - Tripartite Pact: 24 November 1940
  - Invasion of the USSR: 22 June 1941
  - National Uprising: 29 August 1944
  - Fall of Bratislava: 4 April 1945

Area
  - Total: 38,055 km^{2} (14,693 sq mi)

Population
  - Estimate: 2,655,053
- Currency: Slovak koruna (Ks)
- Date format: d. m. yyyy
| Preceded by | Succeeded by |
| Second Czechoslovak Republic; 1939: Autonomous Land of Slovakia | Third Czechoslovak Republic |
- Today part of: Slovakia; Poland

Slovakia, (Note: /sloʊˈvækiə, -ˈvɑːk-/ Slovak: Slovensko [ˈslɔʋenskɔ]) officially the Slovak Republic, (Note: Slovak: (Prvá) Slovenská republika) and from 14 March until 21 July 1939 officially known as the Slovak State (Slovak: Slovenský štát), was a partially recognized client state of Nazi Germany which existed between 14 March 1939 and 4 April 1945 in Central Europe. (Note: Some historians date the end of Slovak independence to the Declaration of the Slovak National Council on 1 September 1944, while others date it to 8 May 1945, when the government signed the surrender document.) The Slovak part of Czechoslovakia declared independence with German support one day before the German occupation of Bohemia and Moravia. It controlled most of the territory of present-day Slovakia, without its current southern parts, which were ceded by Czechoslovakia to Hungary in 1938. It was the first formally independent Slovak state in history. Bratislava was the capital city.

A one-party state governed by the far-right Hlinka's Slovak People's Party, the Slovak Republic is primarily known for its collaboration with Nazi Germany, which included sending troops to the invasion of Poland in September 1939 and the Soviet Union in 1941. In 1940, the country joined the Axis when its leaders signed the Tripartite Pact.

The local Jewish population (according to 1930 census Slovak part of Czechoslovakia had 136,737 Jewish inhabitants, before the loss of Slovak territory to Hungary) was heavily persecuted, with almost 69,000 Jews being murdered or deported (two-thirds of the 89,000 Slovak Jewish population). In 1942, the country deported 58,000 Jews to German-occupied Poland, paying Germany 500 Reichsmarks for each deportee.

Internal opposition to the government's policies culminated in the Slovak National Uprising in 1944, itself triggered by the Nazi German occupation of the country. Although the uprising was eventually suppressed, partisan resistance continued. The Slovak Republic was abolished after the Soviet conquest in 1945, and its territory was reintegrated into the recreated Third Czechoslovak Republic. The current Slovak Republic does not consider itself a successor state of the wartime Slovak Republic, instead a successor to the Czechoslovak Federal Republic. However, some nationalists celebrate 14 March as a day of independence.

== Name ==
The official name of the country was the Slovak State (Slovak: Slovenský štát) from 14 March to 21 July 1939 (until the adoption of the Constitution), and the Slovak Republic (Slovak: Slovenská Republika) from 21 July 1939 to its end in April 1945.

The country is often referred to historically as the First Slovak Republic (Slovak: prvá Slovenská Republika) to distinguish it from the contemporary (Second) Slovak Republic, Slovakia, which is not considered its legal successor state. "Slovak State" was used colloquially, but "First Slovak Republic" was used even in encyclopedias written during the post-war Communist period. Other names were commonly used such as Tiso's Slovakia, Slovakia or Tiso regime.

== Creation ==
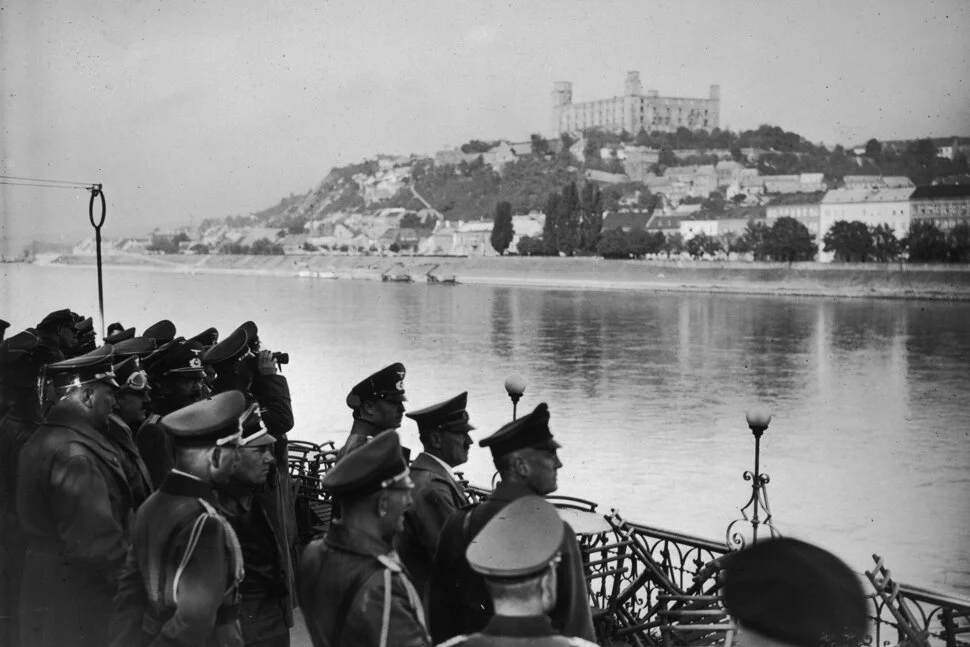
Adolf Hitler on his visit to Bratislava after the Munich Agreement, October 1938

After the Munich Agreement, Slovakia gained autonomy inside Czecho-Slovakia (as former Czechoslovakia had been renamed) and lost its southern territories to Hungary under the First Vienna Award.

As Hitler was preparing a mobilization into Czech territory and the creation of the Protectorate of Bohemia and Moravia, he had various plans for Slovakia. The Hungarians initially misinformed German officials that the Slovaks wanted to join Hungary. Germany decided to make Slovakia a separate puppet state under German influence and a potential strategic base for German attacks on Poland and other regions.

On 13 March 1939, Hitler invited Monsignor Jozef Tiso (the Slovak ex-prime minister who had been deposed by Czechoslovak troops several days earlier) to Berlin and urged him to proclaim Slovakia's independence. Hitler added that if Tiso had not consented, he would have allowed events in Slovakia to take place effectively, leaving it to the mercies of Hungary and Poland. During the meeting, Joachim von Ribbentrop passed on a report claiming that Hungarian troops were approaching the Slovak borders. Tiso refused to make such a decision himself, after which he was allowed by Hitler to organize a meeting of the Slovak parliament ("Diet of the Slovak Land"), which would approve Slovakia's independence.

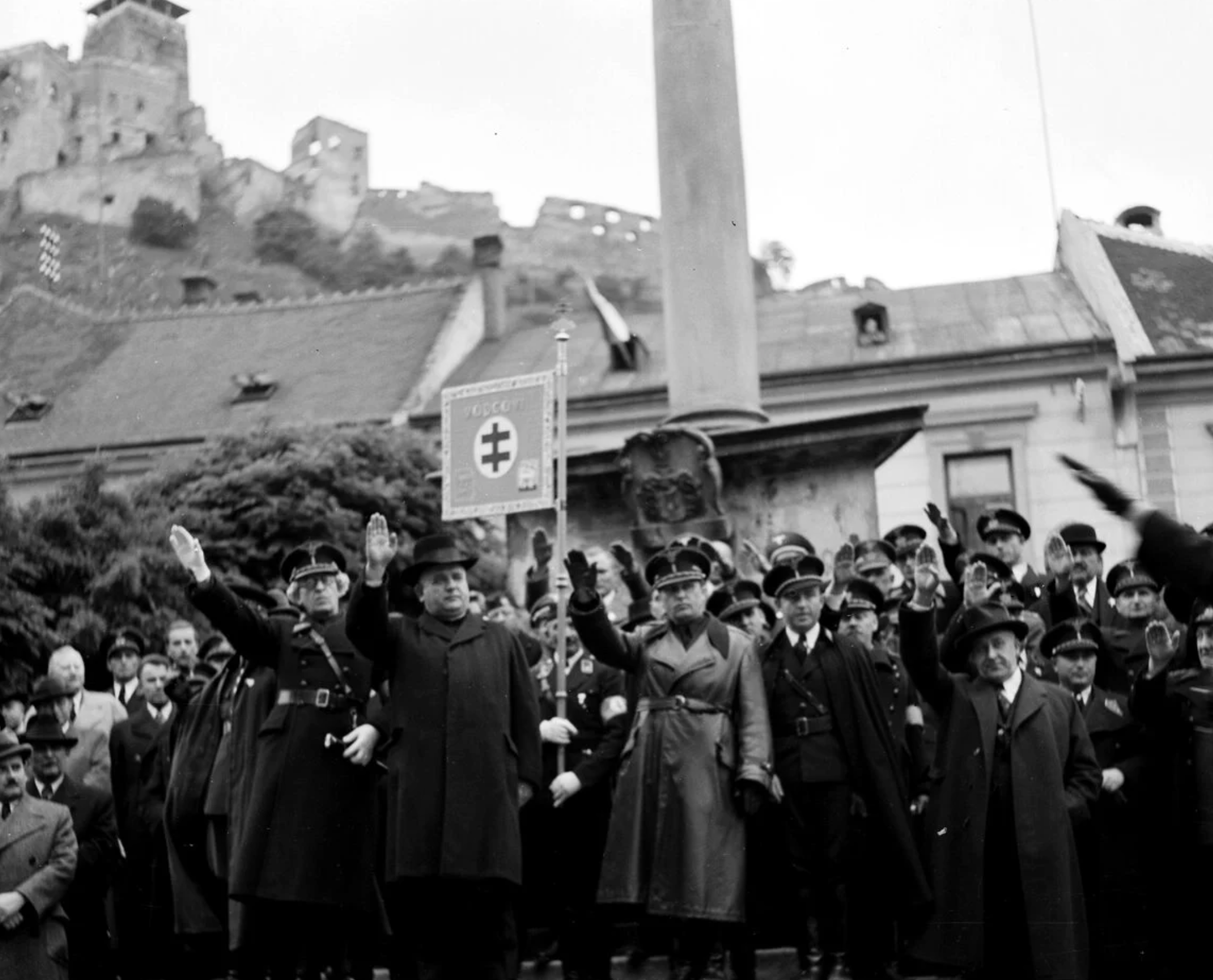
Jozef Tiso in Trenčín, October 1939

On 14 March, the Slovak parliament convened and heard Tiso's report on his discussion with Hitler and a possible declaration of independence. Some of the deputies were skeptical of making such a move, among other reasons, because some worried that the Slovak state would be too small and with a strong Hungarian minority. The debate was quickly brought to a head when Franz Karmasin, leader of the German minority in Slovakia, said that any delay in declaring independence would result in Slovakia being divided between Hungary and Germany. Under these circumstances, Parliament unanimously voted to secede from Czecho-Slovakia, thus creating the first Slovak state in history. Jozef Tiso was appointed the first Prime Minister of the new republic. The next day, Tiso sent a telegram (composed the previous day in Berlin) announcing Slovakia's independence, asking the Reich to take over the protection of the newly minted state. The request was readily accepted.

=== Diplomatic recognition ===
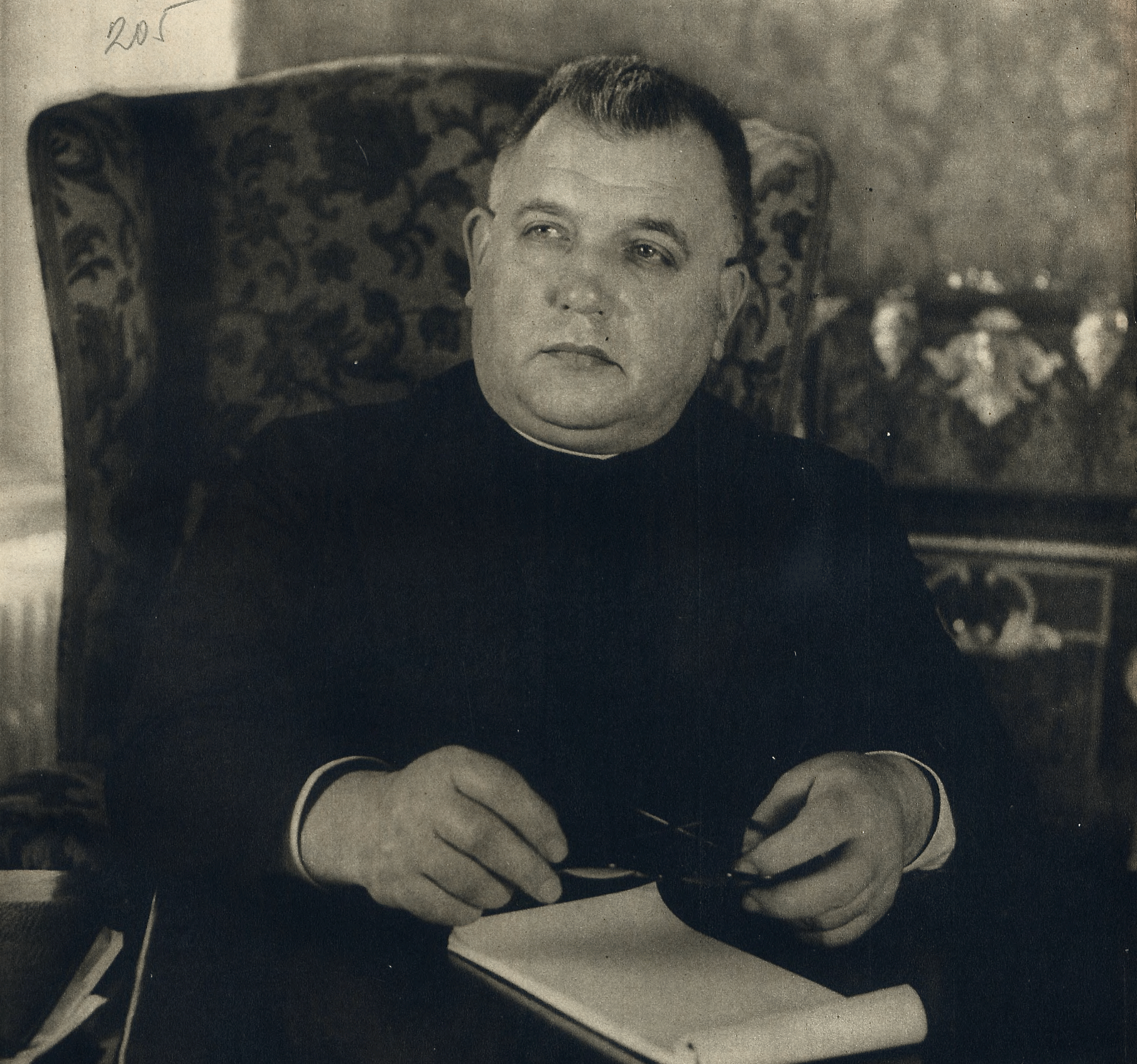
Jozef Tiso served as president of the Slovak Republic.

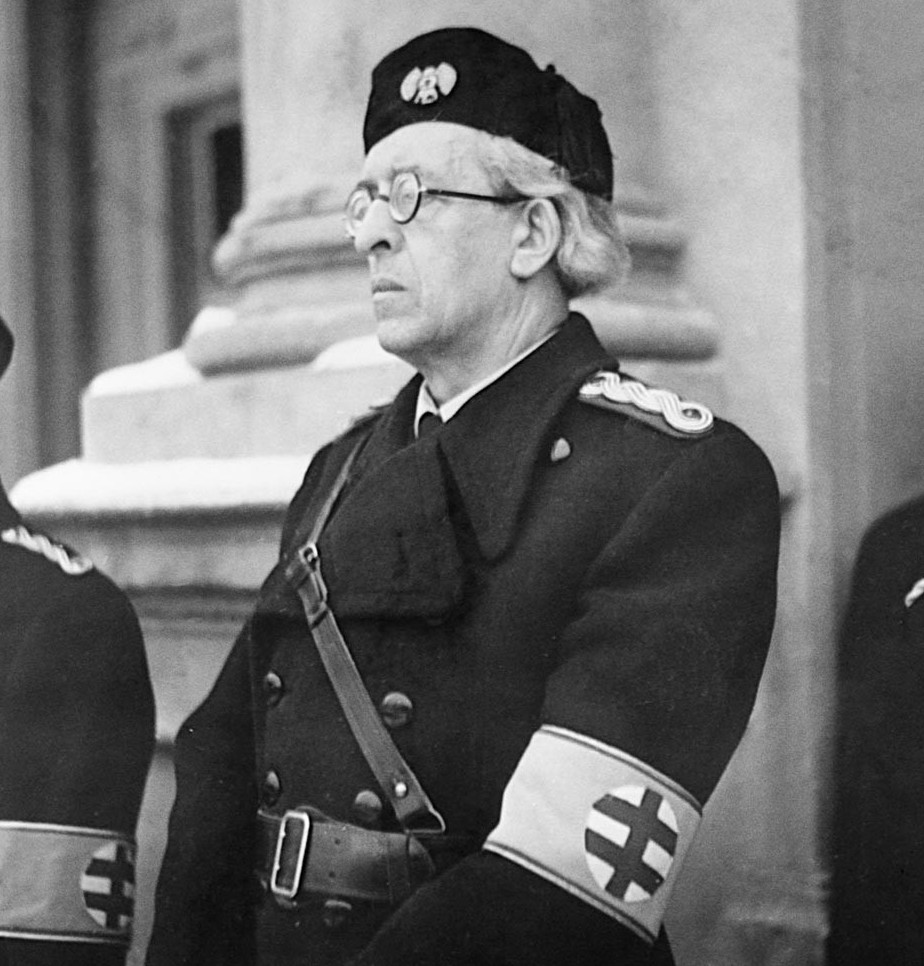
Vojtech Tuka served as prime minister and minister of Foreign Affairs of the Slovak Republic.

Germany and Italy immediately recognized the emergent Slovak state a few weeks later. Britain and France refused to do so; in March 1939, both powers sent diplomatic notes to Berlin protesting developments in former Czechoslovakia as a breach of the Munich Agreement and pledged not to acknowledge the territorial changes. Similar notes – though without reference to Munich – were sent by the USSR and the US. Some non-Axis states, like Switzerland, Poland, and the Vatican, recognized Slovakia in March and April 1939.

The Great Powers soon changed their position. In May, British diplomacy asked for (and received) a new exequatur for its former consul in Bratislava, which marked the recognition of Slovakia. France followed suit in July 1939. However, Czechoslovak legations kept operating in London and Paris. Some international organizations like the League of Nations or the International Labour Union still considered Czechoslovakia their member, but some – like the Universal Postal Union – admitted Slovakia.

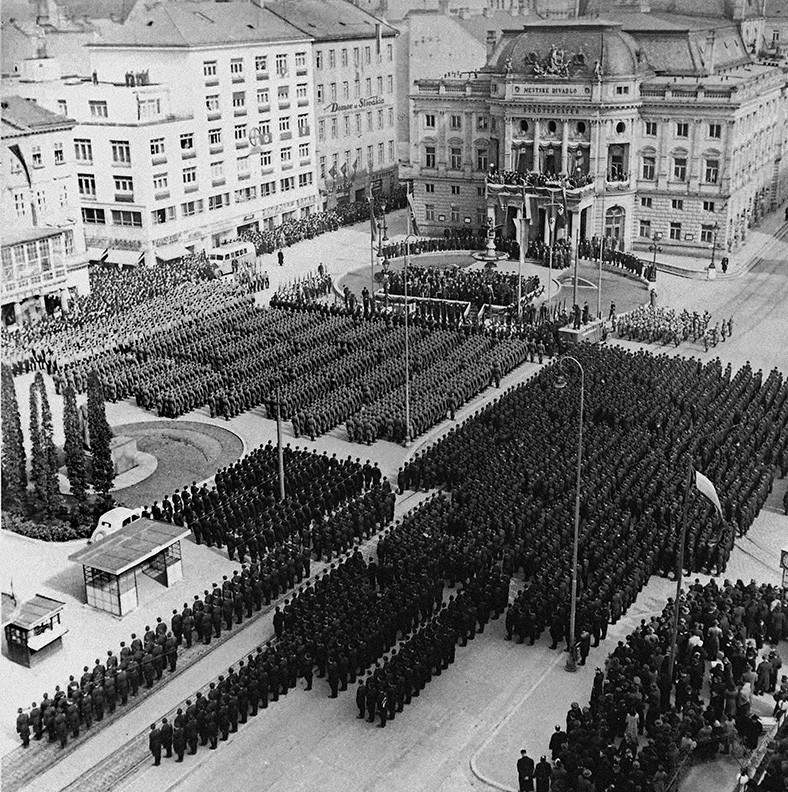
Celebration of the second anniversary of Slovak independence with members of Hlinka Guard and Slovak Army at Hviezdoslav Square in Bratislava, 14 March 1941

Following the outbreak of the Second World War, the British and French consulates in Slovakia were closed, and the territory was declared under occupation. However, in September 1939, the USSR recognized Slovakia, admitted a Slovak representative, and closed the hitherto operational Czechoslovak legation in Moscow. Official Soviet-Slovak diplomatic relations were maintained until the outbreak of the German-Soviet war in 1941, when Slovakia joined the invasion on Germany's side, and the USSR recognized the Czechoslovak government-in-exile; Britain recognized it one year earlier.

In all, 27 states recognized Slovakia. They were either Axis countries (like Romania and Hungary) or Axis-dominated semi-independent states (like Vichy France, Manchukuo) or neutral countries like Lithuania, the Netherlands, and Sweden, as well as some beyond Europe (like Ecuador, Costa Rica, Liberia). In some cases, Czechoslovak legations were closed (e.g., in Switzerland), but some countries opted for a somewhat ambiguous stand. The states that maintained their independence ceased recognizing Slovakia in the late stages of World War II. However, some (e.g., Spain) permitted operations of semi-diplomatic representation until the late 1950s.

The United States never recognized Slovak independence. It remained consistent in their initial approach, as they never recognized the Munich Agreement, the extinction of Czechoslovakia, or any territorial changes made to Czechoslovak territory in the period 1938–1939.

== International relations ==
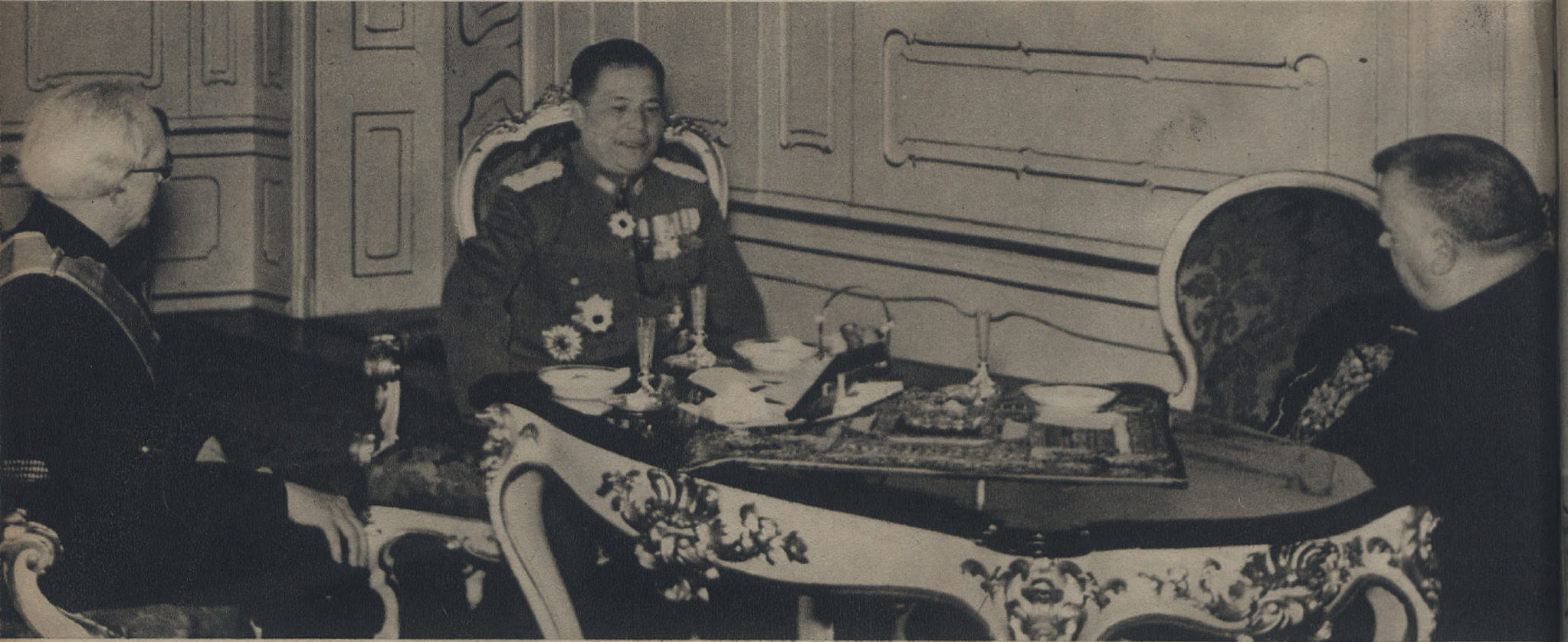
Hiroshi Ōshima, Japanese envoy to the Slovak Republic and Ambassador to Germany with Jozef Tiso and Vojtech Tuka, 1941

From the beginning, the Slovak Republic was under the influence of Germany. The so-called "protection treaty" (Treaty on the protective relationship between Germany and the Slovak State), signed on 23 March 1939, partially subordinated its foreign, military, and economic policy to that of Germany. The German Wehrmacht established the so-called "Protective Zone" (German: Schutzzone) in Western Slovakia in August 1939.

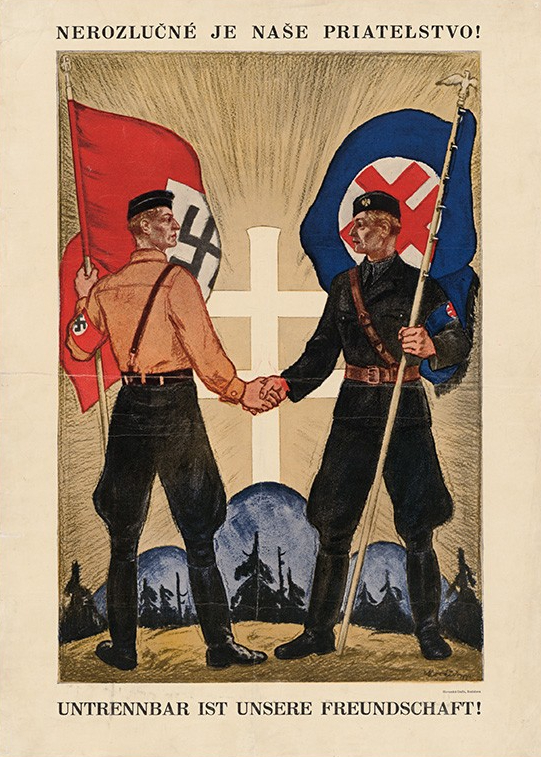
A Slovak-Nazi propaganda poster, "Our friendship is inseparable!", 1940

Following Slovak participation in the invasion of Poland in September 1939, border adjustments increased the Slovak Republic's geographical extent in the areas of Orava and Spiš, absorbing previously Polish-controlled territory.

In July 1940, at the Salzburg Conference, the Germans forced a reshuffle of the Slovak cabinet by threatening to withdraw their protection guarantees.

On 24 November 1940, Slovakia joined the Axis when its leaders signed the Tripartite Pact. Shortly after the signing of the Tripartite Pact, Slovakia, following the Hungarian lead, sent messages of "spiritual adherence" to Germany and Italy.

The Slovak-Soviet Treaty of Commerce and Navigation was signed at Moscow on 6 December 1940.

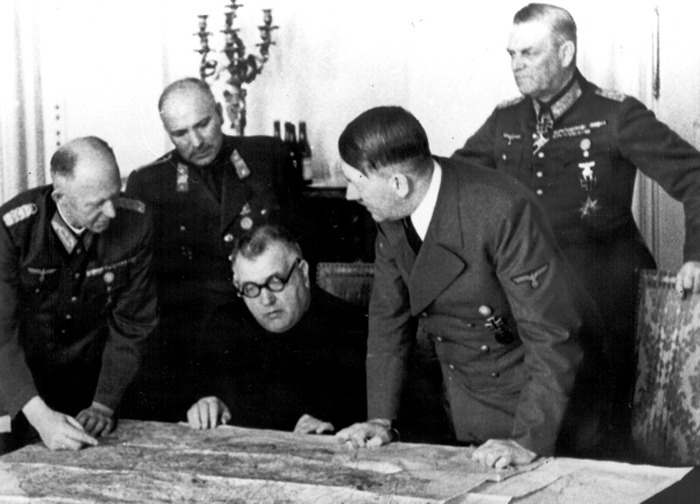
Tiso (sitting), with Hitler, Slovak minister of defence Ferdinand Čatloš and Wilhelm Keitel in Salzburg, 1940

Slovakia declared war on the Soviet Union in 1941 and on 25 November 1941 signed anti-communist the Anti-Comintern Pact. The Slovak military participated in the war on the Eastern Front since Operation Barbarossa.

In 1942, Slovakia declared war on the United Kingdom and the United States.

The Croatian–Romanian–Slovak friendship proclamation was created in May 1942 to stop further Hungarian expansion. It can be compared to the Little Entente.

The state's most difficult foreign policy problem involved relations with Hungary, which had annexed one-third of Slovakia's territory by the First Vienna Award of 2 November 1938. Slovakia tried to achieve a revision of the Vienna Award, but Germany did not allow it. There were also constant quarrels concerning Hungary's treatment of Slovaks living in Hungary.

== Characteristics ==
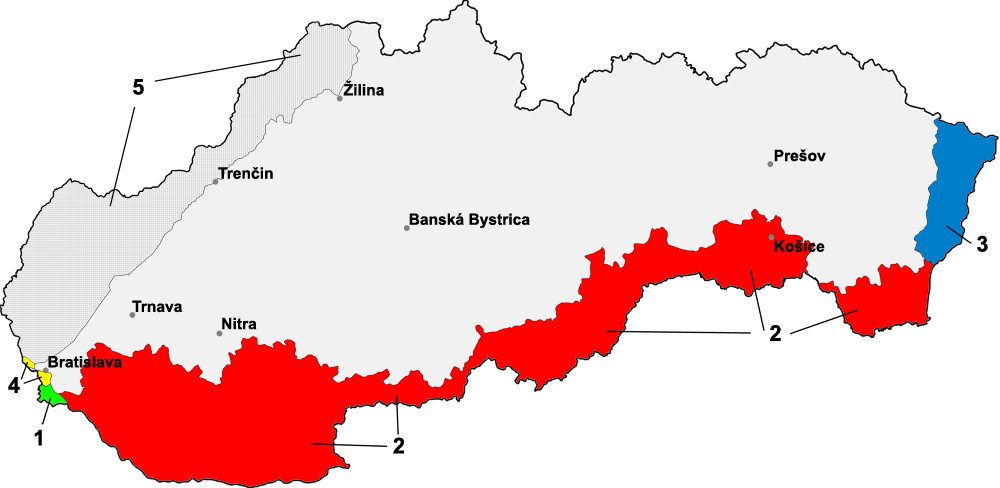
Territorial changes of Slovak Republic from 1938 to 1947 (Red indicating areas which became a part of Hungary, due to the First Vienna Award. Changes on the border with Poland are missing.)

2.6 million people lived within the 1939 borders of the Slovak State, and 85 percent had declared Slovak nationality on the 1938 census. Minorities included Germans (4.8 percent), Czechs (2.9 percent), Rusyns (2.6 percent), Hungarians (2.1 percent), Jews (1.1 percent), and Romani people (0.9 percent). Seventy-five percent of Slovaks were Catholics. Most of the remainder belonged to the Lutheran and Greek Catholic churches. 50% of the population were employed in agriculture. The state was divided in six counties (župy), 58 districts (okresy) and 2659 municipalities. The capital, Bratislava, had over 140,000 inhabitants.

The "autonomist flag". 1938–45 party flag of the Hlinka's Slovak People's Party with Patriarchal cross.

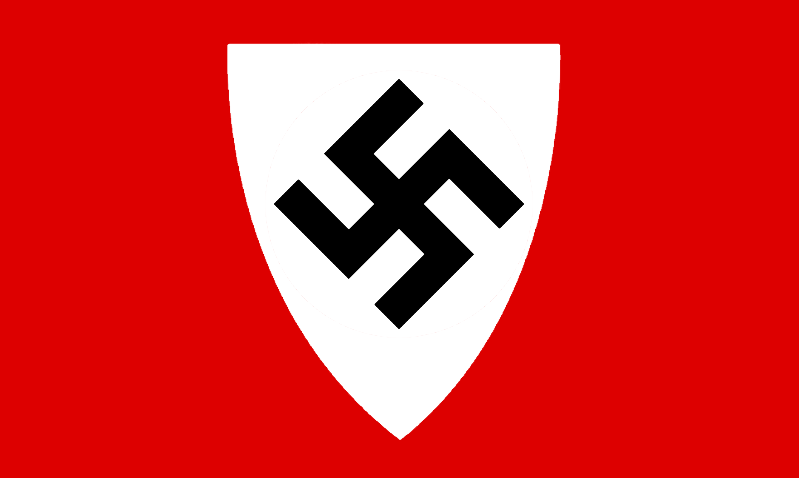
Flag of the German Party in the Slovak Republic

The state continued the legal system of Czechoslovakia, which was modified only gradually. According to the Constitution of 1939, the "President" (Jozef Tiso) was the head of the state, the "Assembly/Diet of the Slovak Republic" elected for five years, was the highest legislative body (no general elections took place, however), and the "State Council" performed the duties of a senate. The government, which had eight ministries, was the executive body.

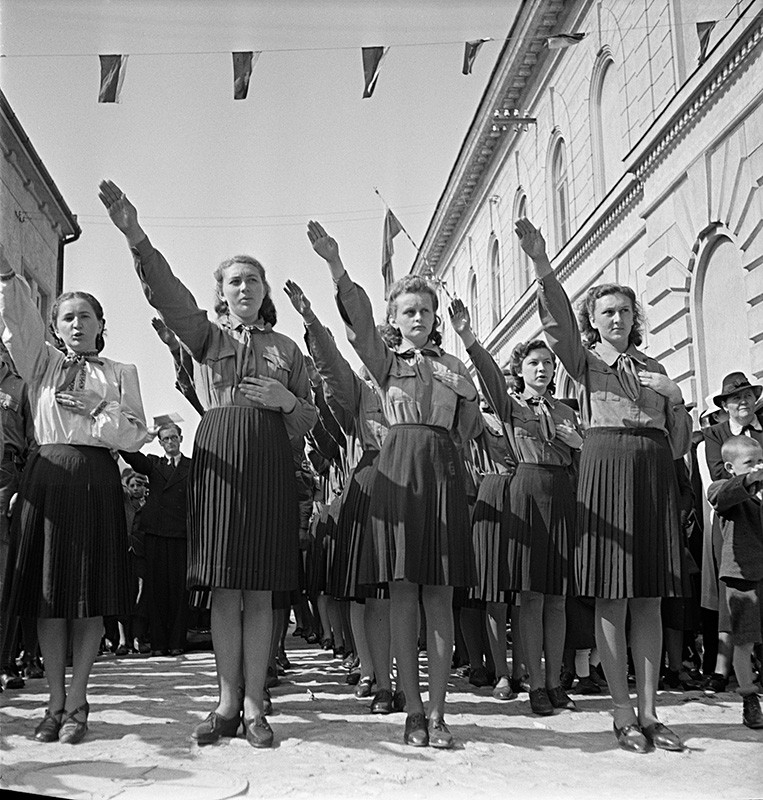
Slovak women performing the Nazi salute

The Slovak Republic was an authoritarian regime that adopted some elements of Nazism. Some historians characterize Tiso's regime as clerical fascism although the term is disputed, but others describe it as para-fascist or "not quite fascist". The government issued many antisemitic laws prohibiting the remaining (after loss of territory to Hungary) 89000 Slovak Jews from participation in public life and actively supported their deportation to concentration camps erected by Germany on occupied Polish territory by paying 500 Reichsmarks for each deported Slovak Jew to Nazi death camps.

The only political parties permitted were the dominant Hlinka's Slovak People's Party and two smaller openly fascist parties, these being the Hungarian National Party which represented the Hungarian minority and the German Party which represented the German minority. However, those two parties formed part of a coalition with the Hlinka's Slovak People's Party; for all intents and purposes, Slovakia was a one-party state.

The state advocated excluding women from the public sphere and politics. While promoting "natural" maternal duties of women, the regime aimed to restrict women's space to the privacy of family life. Slovakia's pro-natalist programs limited access to previously available birth-control methods and introduced harsher punishments for already criminalized abortions.

Presidential standard of the Slovak Republic

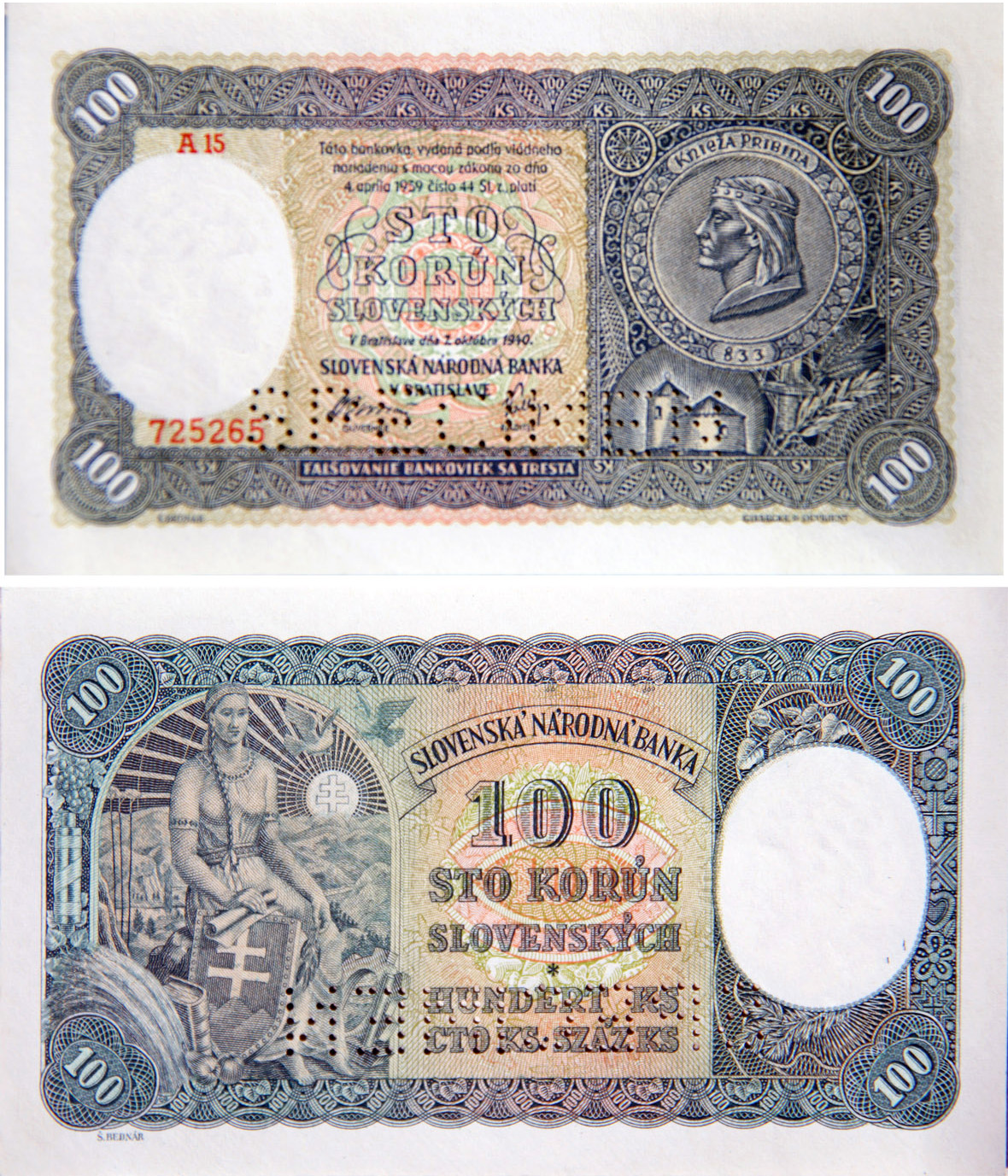
Slovak koruna, the official currency of Slovak Republic

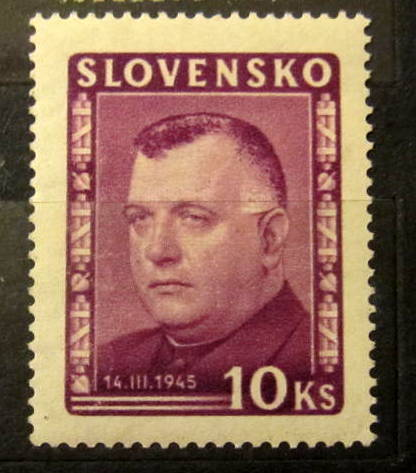
Stamp of Slovak Republic issued 14 March 1945 in the value 10 slovak koruna

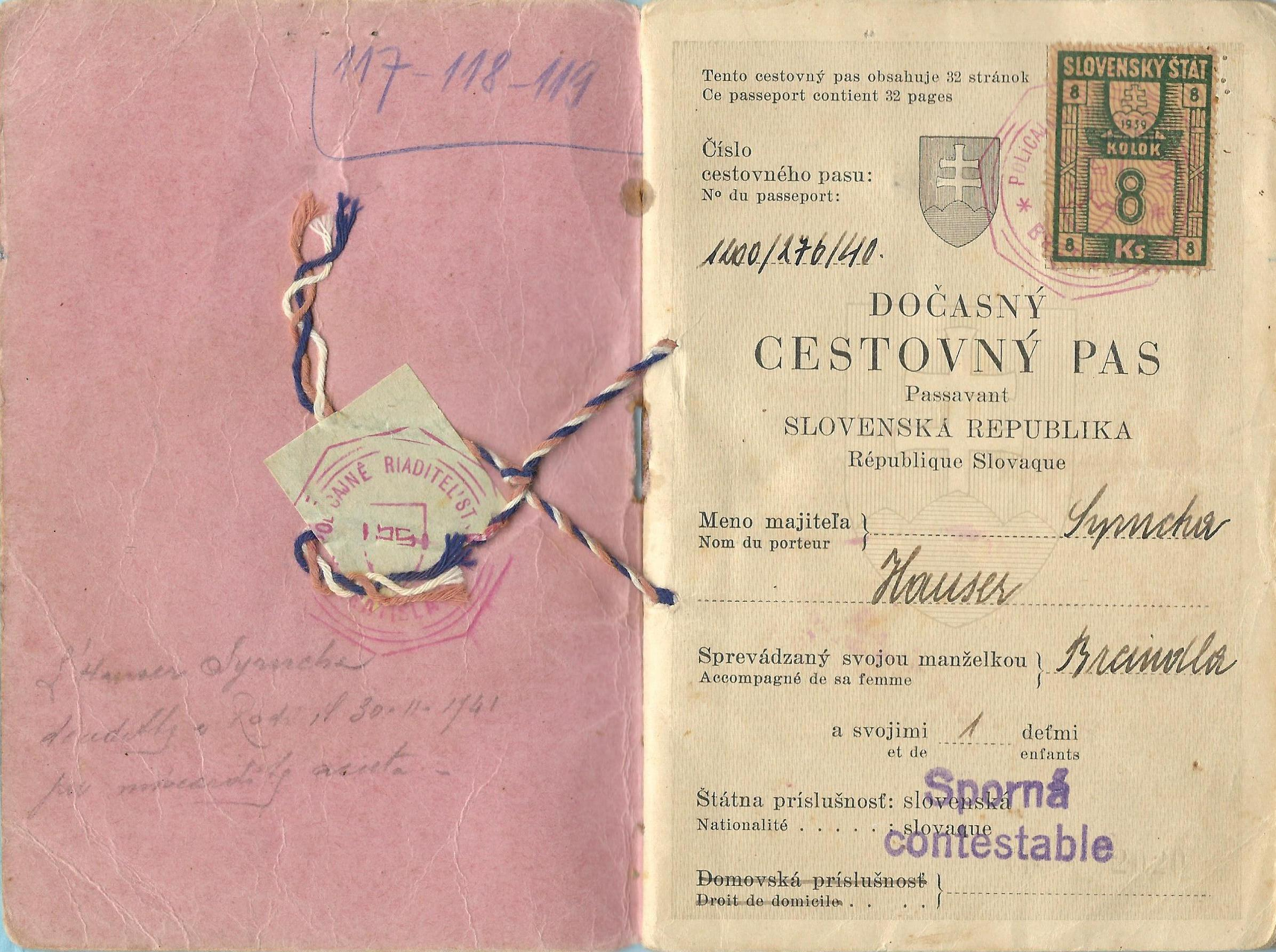
Temporary Slovak passport issued in 1940 to a Jewish refugee family

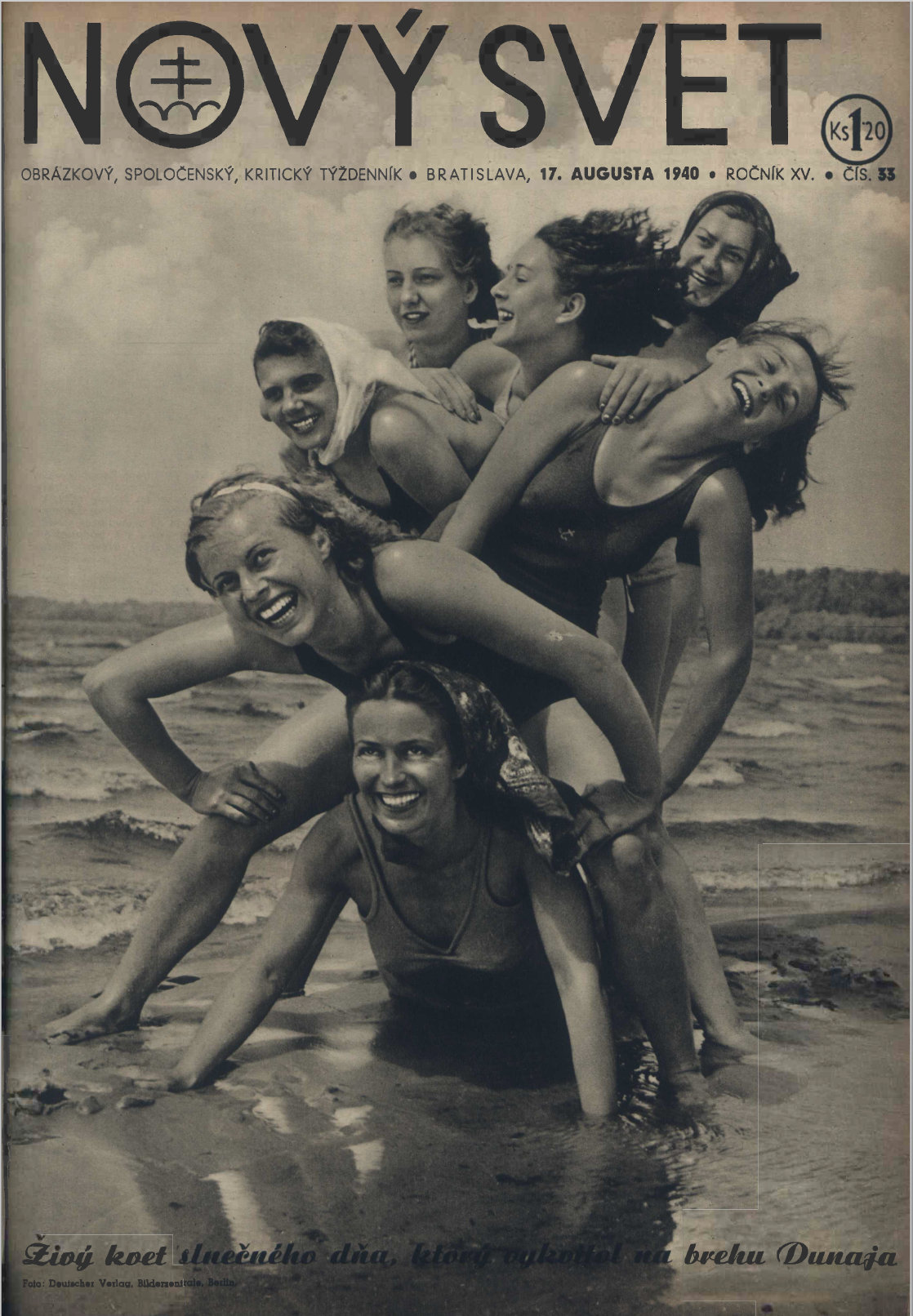
Cover of Slovak weekly magazine "New World", August 1940

=== SS plans for German minority ===
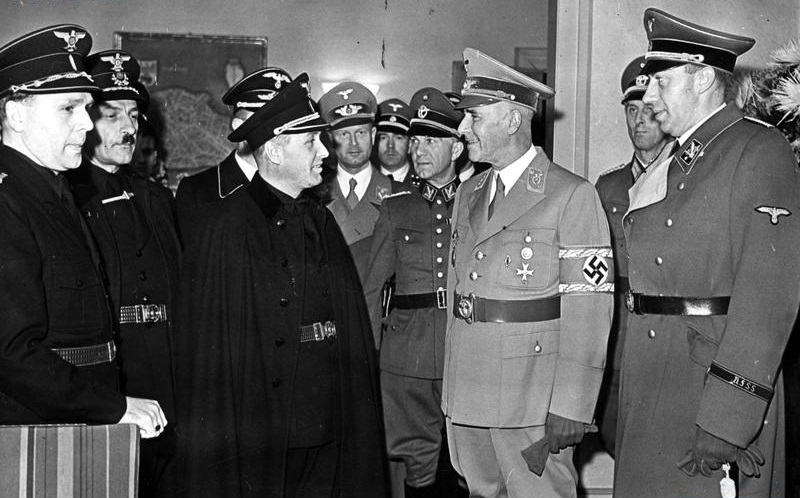
Commander of Hlinka Guard Interior Minister Alexander Mach and German Interior Minister Wilhelm Frick visit in Nazi Germany

Although the official policy of the Nazi regime was in favor of an independent Slovak Republic dependent on Germany and opposed to any annexations of Slovak territory, Heinrich Himmler's SS considered ambitious population policy options concerning the German minority of Slovakia, which numbered circa 130,000 people.

In 1940, Günther Pancke, head of the SS RuSHA ("Race and Settlement Office"), undertook a study trip in Slovak lands where ethnic Germans were present and reported to Himmler that the Slovak Germans were in danger of disappearing. Pancke recommended that action should be taken to fuse the racially valuable part of the Slovaks into the German minority and remove the Romani and Jewish populations. He stated that this would be possible by "excluding" the Hungarian minority of the country and by settling some 100,000 ethnic German families in Slovakia. The racial core of this Germanization policy was to be gained from the Hlinka Guard, which was to be further integrated into the SS shortly.

== Leaders and politicians ==
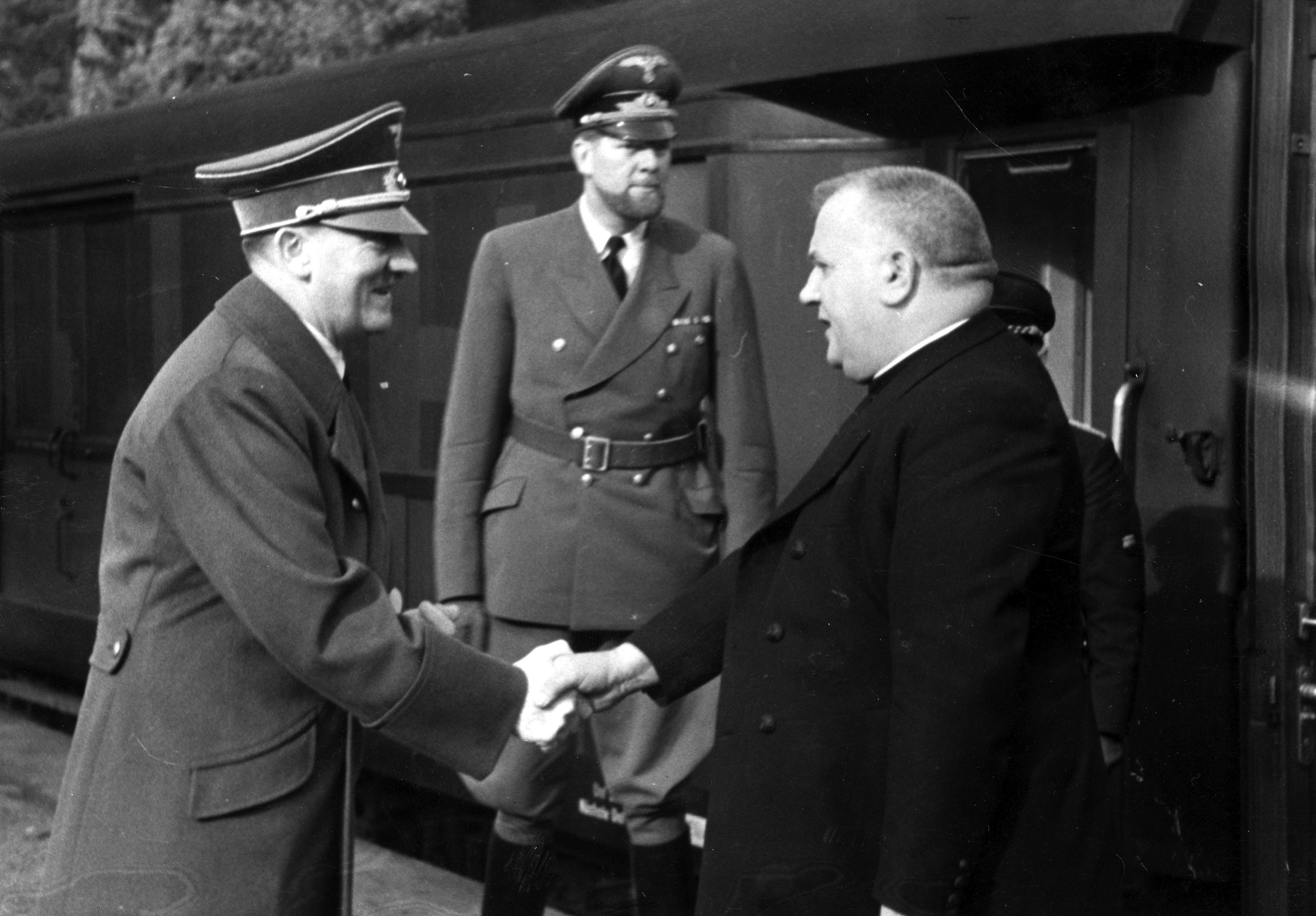
German Führer Adolf Hitler greeting president of the Slovak Republic Jozef Tiso, 1941

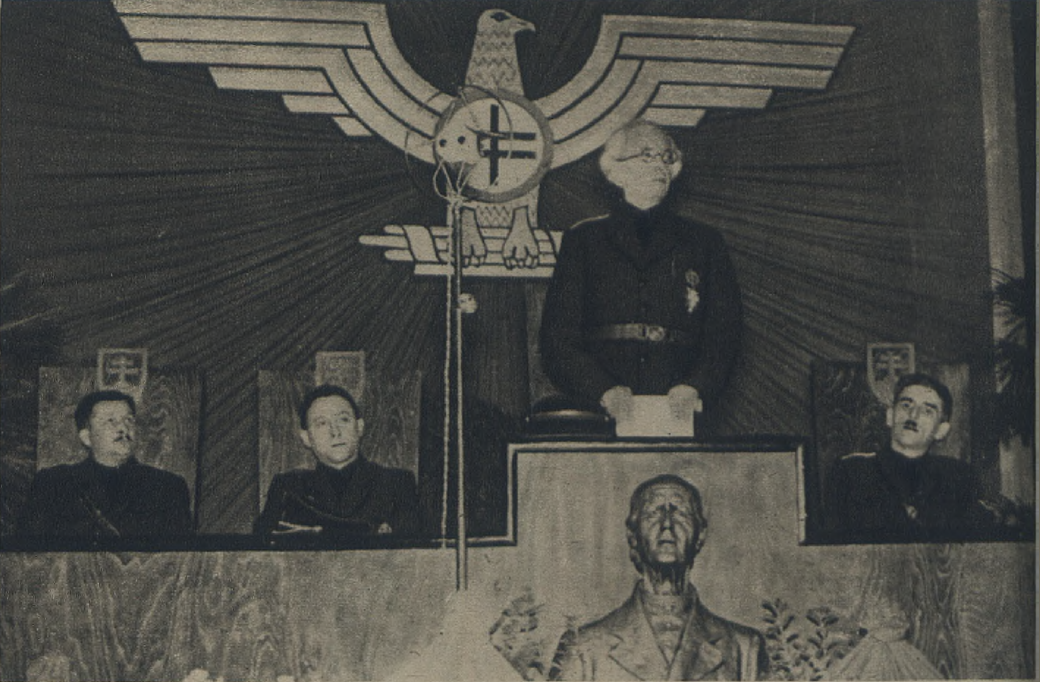
Prime Minister of the Slovak Republic Vojtech Tuka speaking at the Hlinka Guard commanders' meeting, 1941

=== President ===
- Jozef Tiso (26 October 1939 – 4 April 1945)

=== Prime ministers ===
- Jozef Tiso (14 March 1939 – 26 October 1939)
- Vojtech Tuka (26 October 1939 – 5 September 1944)
- Štefan Tiso (5 September 1944 – 4 April 1945)

=== Commanders of German occupation forces (after Slovak National Uprising) ===
- Ogruf. Gottlob Christian Berger (29 August 1944 – 20 September 1944)
- Ogruf. Hermann Höfle (20 September 1944 – 3 April 1945)

=== Commanders of Soviet forces ===
The Red Army entered Slovakia from multiple sides at once. The units of the 1st Ukrainian Front together with the members of the 1st Czechoslovak Army Corps crossed the Dukla Pass after Battle of the Dukla Pass on 6 October 1944. Units of the 2nd Ukrainian Front and the Romanian Army came from the South-East.

- G.A. Ivan Yefimovich Petrov (October 1944 – March 1945)
- G.A. Andrey Ivanovich Yeryomenko (April 1945 – July 1945)

== Administrative divisions ==
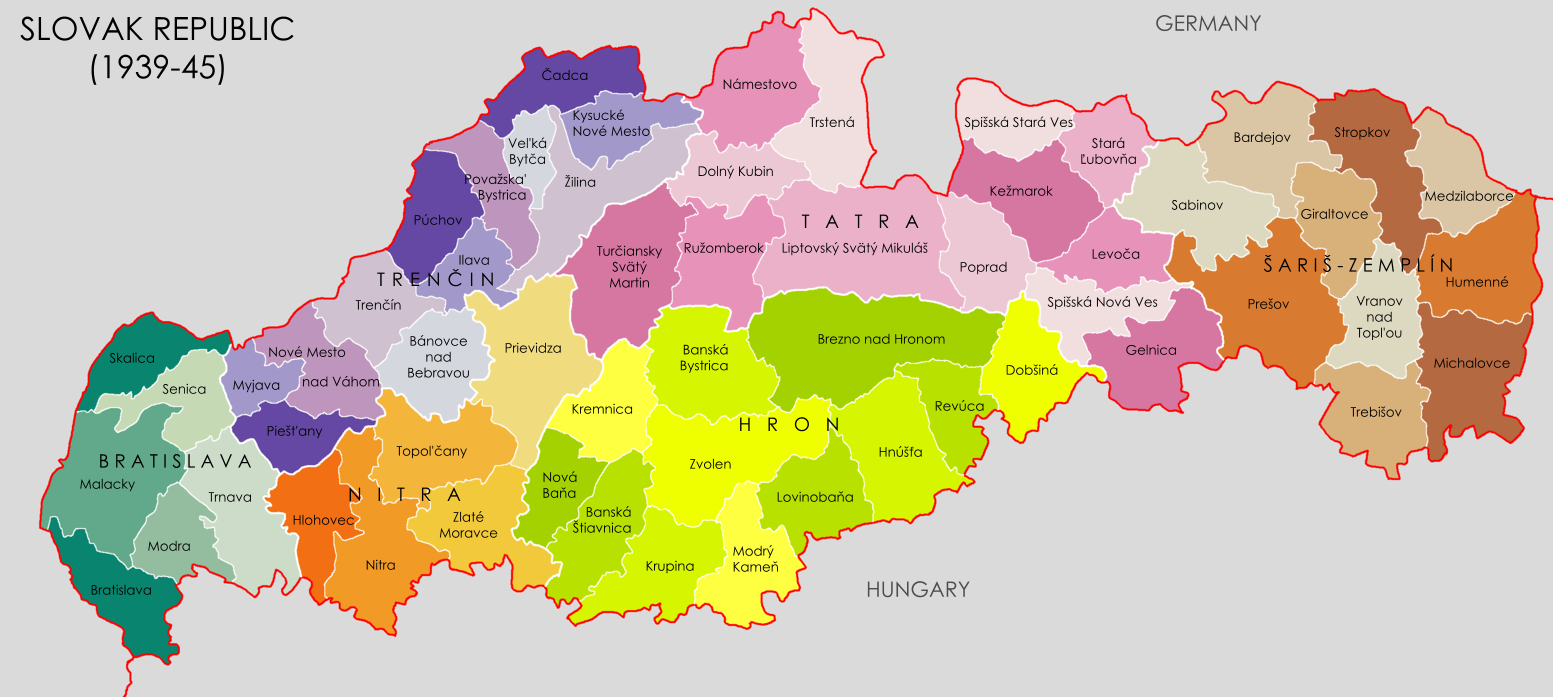
The Slovak Republic (1939–1945)

The Slovak Republic was divided into 6 counties and 58 districts. The extant population records are from the same time:

1. Bratislava county (Bratislavská župa), 3,667 km^{2}, with 455,728 inhabitants, and 6 districts: Bratislava, Malacky, Modra, Senica, Skalica, and Trnava.
2. Nitra county (Nitrianska župa), 3,546 km^{2}, with 335,343 inhabitants, and 5 districts: Hlohovec, Nitra, Prievidza, Topoľčany, and Zlaté Moravce.
3. Trenčín county (Trenčianska župa), 5,592 km^{2}, with 516,698 inhabitants, and 12 districts: Bánovce nad Bebravou, Čadca, Ilava, Kysucké Nové Mesto, Myjava, Nové Mesto nad Váhom, Piešťany, Považská Bystrica, Púchov, Trenčín, Veľká Bytča, and Žilina.
4. Tatra county (Tatranská župa), 9,222 km^{2}, with 463,286 inhabitants, and 13 districts: Dolný Kubín, Gelnica, Kežmarok, Levoča, Liptovský Svätý Mikuláš, Námestovo, Poprad, Ružomberok, Spišská Nová Ves, Spišská Stará Ves, Stará Ľubovňa, Trstená, and Turčiansky Svätý Martin.
5. Šariš-Zemplín county (Šarišsko-zemplínska župa), 7,390 km^{2}, with 440,372 inhabitants, and 10 districts: Bardejov, Giraltovce, Humenné, Medzilaborce, Michalovce, Prešov, Sabinov, Stropkov, Trebišov, and Vranov nad Topľou.
6. Hron county (Pohronská župa), 8,587 km^{2}, with 443,626 inhabitants, and 12 districts: Banská Bystrica, Banská Štiavnica, Brezno nad Hronom, Dobšiná, Hnúšťa, Kremnica, Krupina, Lovinobaňa, Modrý Kameň, Nová Baňa, Revúca, and Zvolen.

== Slovak military ==
=== War with Hungary (1939) ===
On 23 March 1939, Hungary, having already occupied Carpatho-Ukraine, attacked from there, and the newly established Slovak Republic was forced to cede 1,697 square kilometres (655 sq mi) of territory with about 70,000 people to Hungary before the onset of World War II. The border between Slovakia and Hungary lasted from March 23 to March 31. Although Slovakia had signed a "Protection Treaty" with Nazi Germany, Germany refused to help Slovakia, in direct violation of that treaty.

On November 2, 1938, the First Vienna Award transferred the territories of southern Slovakia and southern Ruthenia to Hungary. Hungary was granted an area of 11,927 km^{2} with a population of 869,299. According to the 1941 Census, 86.5% of these were ethnic Hungarians. Hitler even promised to transfer all of Slovakia to Hungary in exchange for military support from Budapest in the war soon to be unleashed against the Soviet Union, but the Hungarians were reluctant to engage in warfare. Instead, they agreed to a territorial revision along ethnic separation lines.

=== Slovak forces during the campaign against Poland (1939) ===
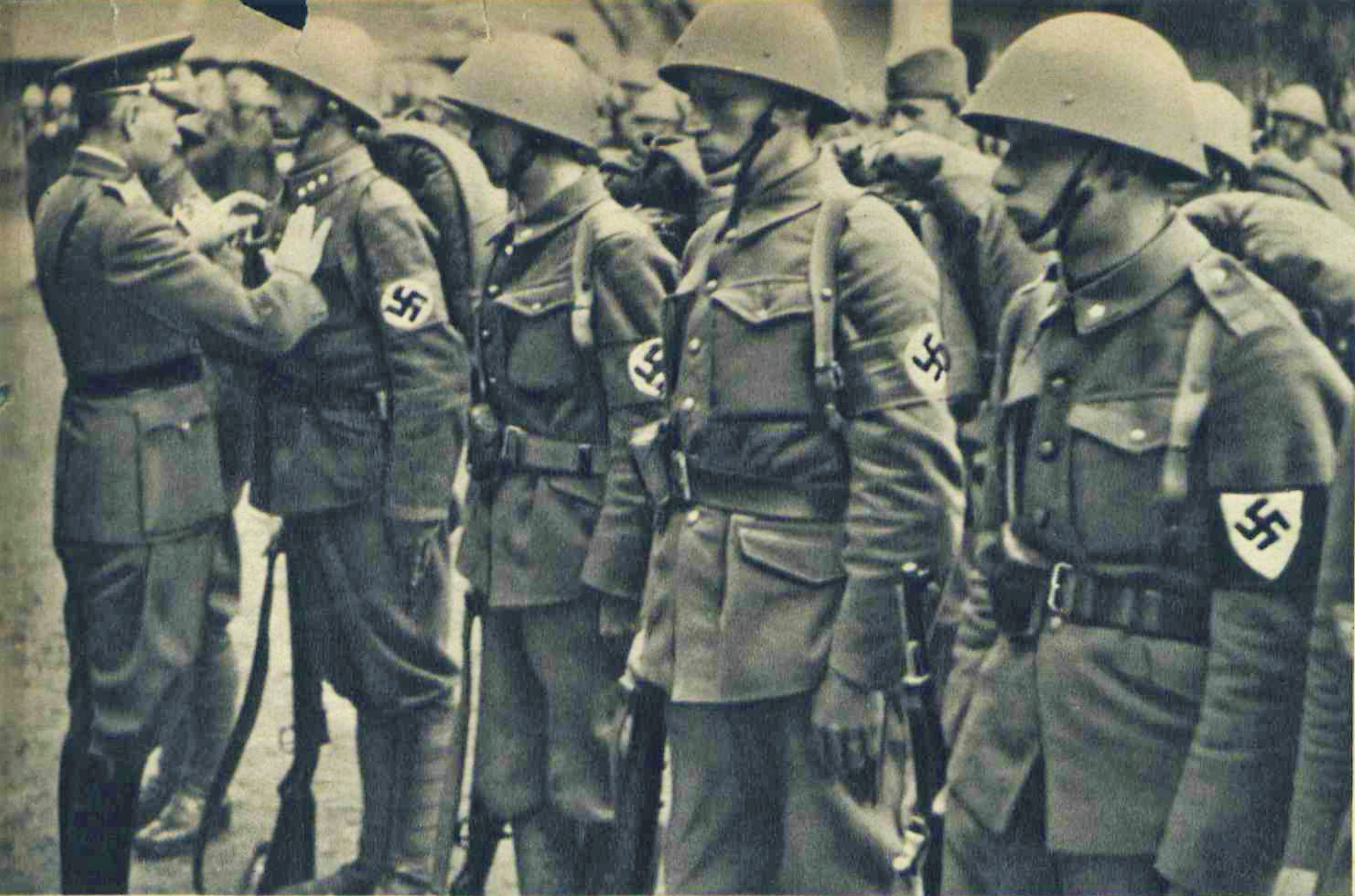
Slovak Minister of Defence Ferdinand Čatloš decorates ethnic Germans in the Slovak Army after the invasion in Poland.

Slovakia was the only Axis nation other than Germany to take part in the Invasion of Poland. With the impending invasion planned for early September 1939, the Oberkommando der Wehrmacht (OKW) requested the assistance of Slovakia. Although the Slovak military was only six months old, it formed a small mobile combat group consisting of several infantry and artillery battalions. Two combat groups were created for the campaign in Poland alongside the Germans. The first group was a brigade-sized formation that consisted of six infantry battalions, two artillery battalions, and a company of combat engineers, all commanded by Antonín Pulanich. The second group was a mobile formation that consisted of two battalions of combined cavalry and motorcycle recon troops along with nine motorized artillery batteries, all commanded by Gustav Malár. The two groups reported to the headquarters of the 1st and 3rd Slovak Infantry Divisions. The two combat groups fought while pushing through the Nowy Sącz and Dukla Mountain Passes, advancing towards Dębica and Tarnów in the region of southern Poland.

Slovakia's Field Army Bernolák, consisting of three infantry divisions and a mobile group, participated in the invasion and was subordinate to Germany's Army Group South.

=== Slovak forces during the campaign against the Soviet Union (1941–1944) ===
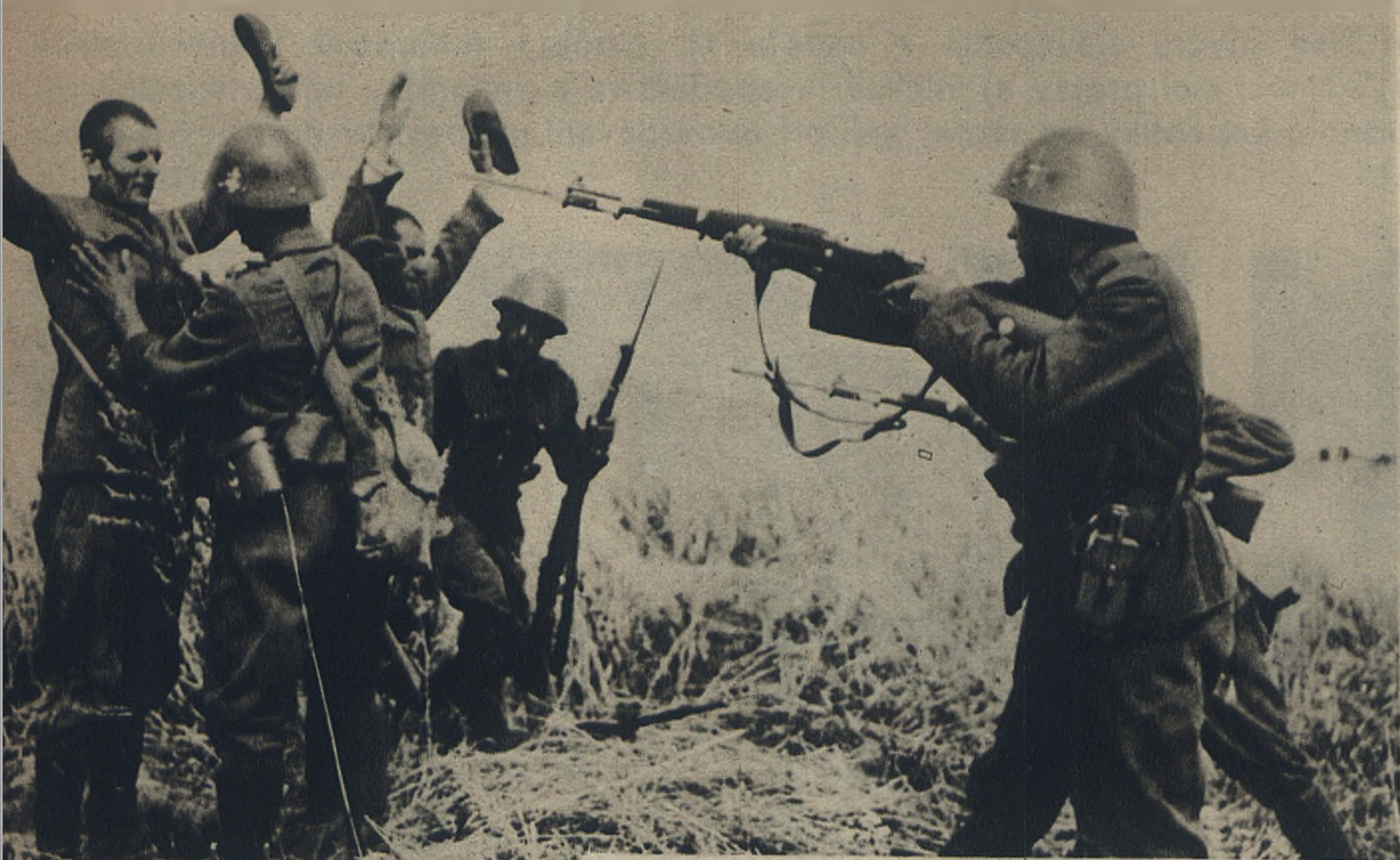
Slovak soldiers force Red Army soldiers to surrender.

Slovakia did not participate in the start of the Axis invasion of the Soviet Union, which began on June 22, 1941. Hitler and other Nazi leaders distrusted the Slovaks against participating in Eastern European campaigns because they were Slavs. Although Hitler did not ask for help from Slovakia, the Slovak Expeditionary Army Group of about 45,000 entered the Soviet Union shortly after the German attack. This army lacked logistic and transportation support, so a much smaller unit, the Slovak Mobile Command (Pilfousek Brigade), was formed from units selected from this force; the rest of the Slovak army was relegated to rear-area security duty. The Slovak Mobile Command was attached to the German 17th Army (as was the Hungarian Carpathian Group also) and shortly thereafter given over to direct German command, the Slovaks lacking the command infrastructure to exercise effective operational control. This unit fought with the 17th Army through July 1941, including at the Battle of Uman.

At the beginning of August 1941, the Slovak Mobile Command was dissolved, and instead, two infantry divisions were formed from the Slovak Expeditionary Army Group. The Slovak 2nd Division was a security division, but the Slovak 1st Division was a front-line unit that fought in the campaigns of 1941 and 1942, reaching the Caucasus area with Army Group B. The Slovak 1st Division then shared the fate of the German southern forces, losing their heavy equipment in the Kuban bridgehead, then being badly mangled near Melitopol in southern Ukraine. In June 1944, the remnant of the division, no longer considered fit for combat due to low morale, was disarmed, and the personnel were assigned to construction work. This fate had already befallen the Slovak 2nd Division earlier for the same reason.

4,000 Slovak soldiers were casualties in the fighting on the Eastern Front. There was also a high rate of desertion, at first individuals but later large groups of soldiers disillusioned with the war.

== Hlinka Guard ==
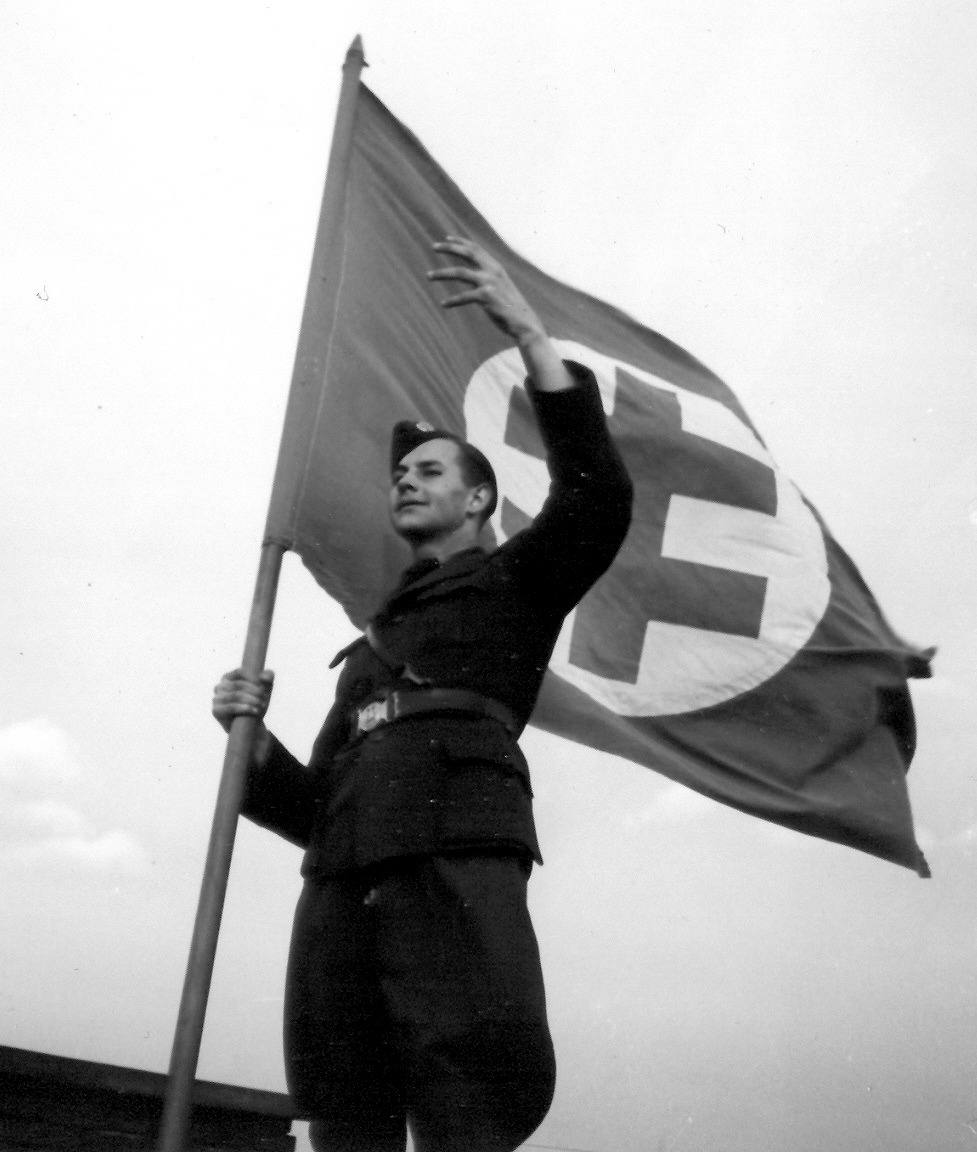
Hlinka Guard flag bearer

The Hlinka Guard was a paramilitary organization of the Hlinka's Slovak People's Party. It was created in 1938, and it was built according to the Nazi model. Even though there was an attempt to establish it as an organization with compulsory membership for all adult citizens (except Jews) in 1939, this idea was soon changed, and membership in the Guard was voluntary.

The Hlinka Guard was Slovakia's state police and most willingly helped Hitler with his plans. It operated against Jews, Czechs, Hungarians, the Left, and the opposition. By a decree issued on 29 October 1938, the Hlinka Guard was designated as the only body authorized to give its members paramilitary training, and it was this decree that established its formal status in the country. Hlinka guardsmen wore black uniforms and a cap shaped like a boat, with a woolen pompom on top, and they used the raised-arm salute. The official salute was "Na stráž!" ("On guard!"). Throughout its existence, the Hlinka Guard competed with the Hlinka party for primacy in ruling the country.

In 1941 Hlinka Guard shock troops were trained in SS camps in Germany, and the SS attached an adviser to the guard. At this point many of the guardsmen who were of middle-class origin quit, and thenceforth the organization consisted of peasants and unskilled laborers, together with various doubtful elements. A social message was an integral part of the radical nationalism that it sought to impart.

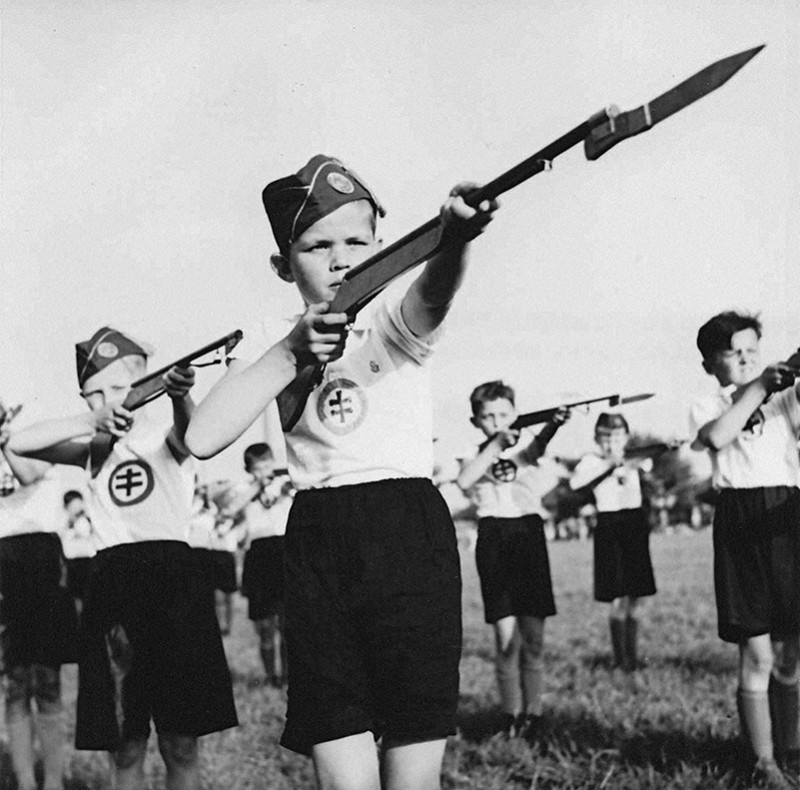
Boy members of Hlinka Youth during training with weapon, 1940

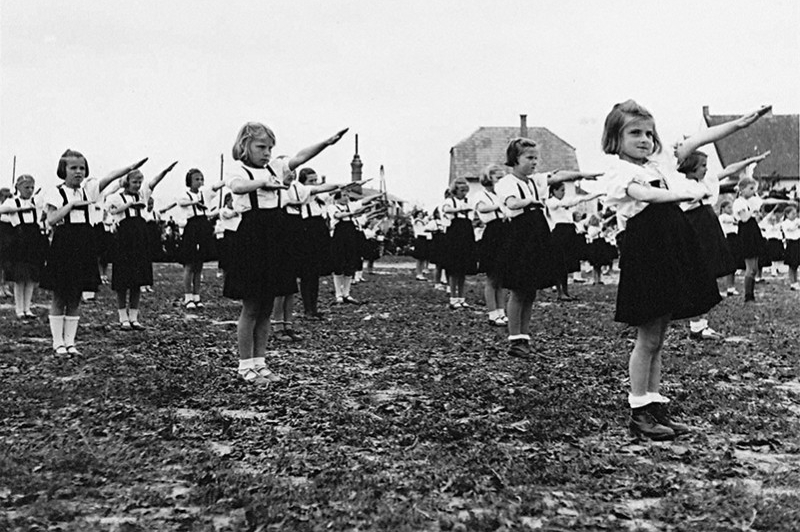
Girl members of Hlinka Youth performing the Nazi salute, 1941

A small group called Náš Boj (Our Struggle), which operated under SS auspices, was the most radical element in the guard.

After the anti-Nazi Slovak National Uprising was crushed in August 1944, the SS took over and shaped the Hlinka Guard to suit its purposes. Special units of the guard (Hlinka Guard Emergency Divisions – POHG) were employed against partisans and Jews.

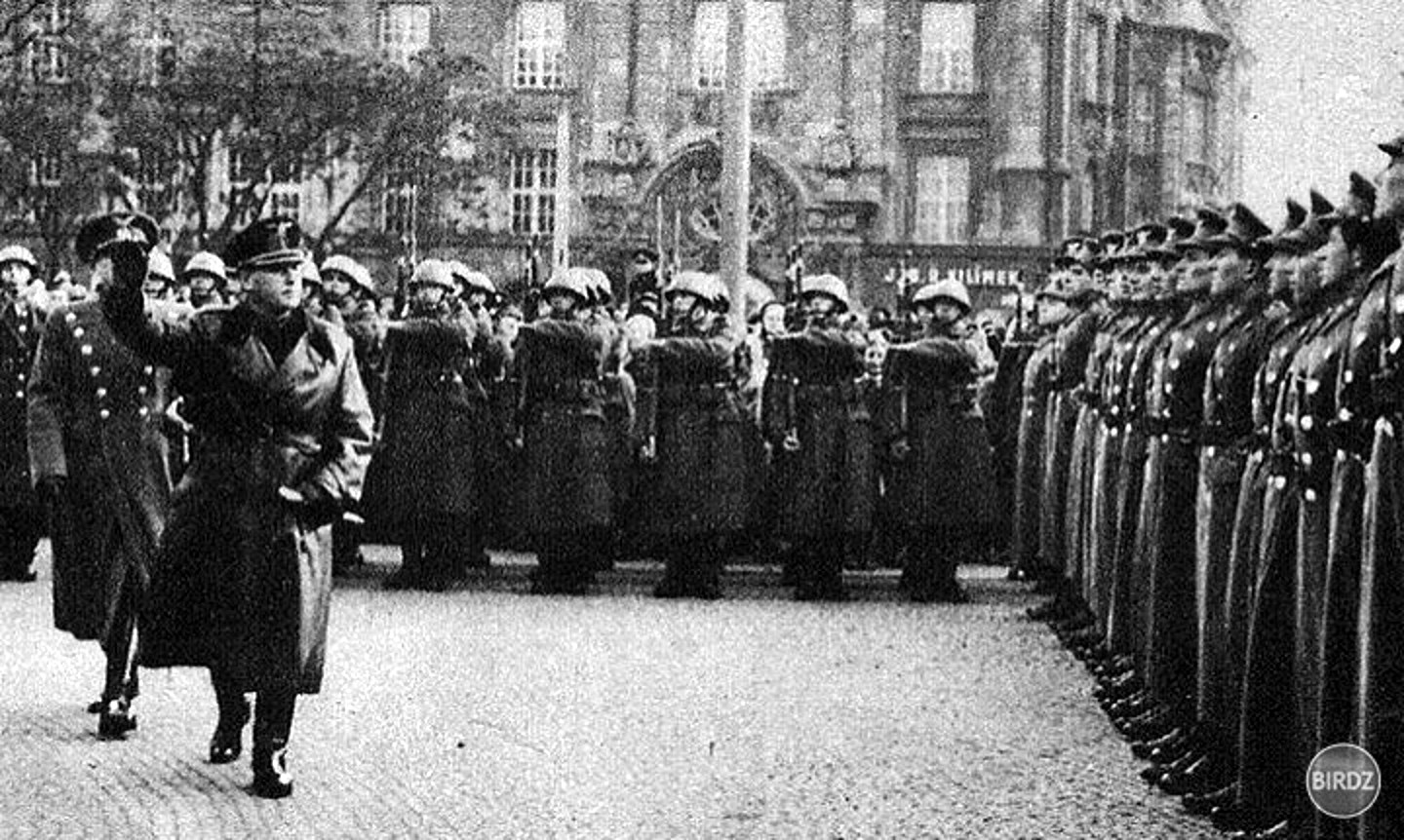
Hlinka Guard

The Hlinka Guard was known for its participation in the Holocaust in Slovakia; its members appropriated Jewish property and rounded up Jews for deportation. In 1942, the guard was involved in the deportation of almost 60,000 Slovak Jews to occupied Poland. The victims were given only four hours' warning, to prevent them from escaping. Beatings and forcible shaving were commonplace, as was subjecting Jews to invasive searches to uncover hidden valuables. Some guards took advantage of their power to rape Jewish women.

The Hlinka Youth was also an organization subordinated to the Hlinka's Slovak People's Party. It was formed as a single nationwide organization in 1938. Initially, it was just for boys, but later, there was also a chapter for girls.

== The Holocaust ==
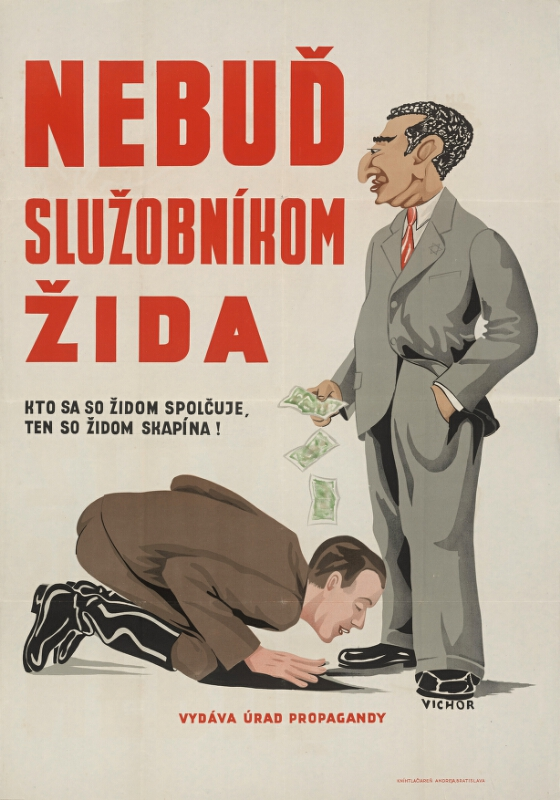
A Slovak propaganda poster, "Do not be a servant to the Jew"

Soon after independence and along with the mass exile and deportation of Czechs, the Slovak Republic began a series of measures aimed against the Jews in the country. The Hlinka's Guard began to attack Jews, and the "Jewish Code" was passed in September 1941. Resembling the Nuremberg Laws, the code required Jews to wear a yellow armband and banned them from intermarriage and many jobs. By October 1941, the Slovak Republic had expelled 15,000 Jews from Bratislava, sending many to labor camps.

At the end of 1941, the Jews were concentrated in three labor camps located within Slovak borders – Sereď, Nováky and Vyhne.

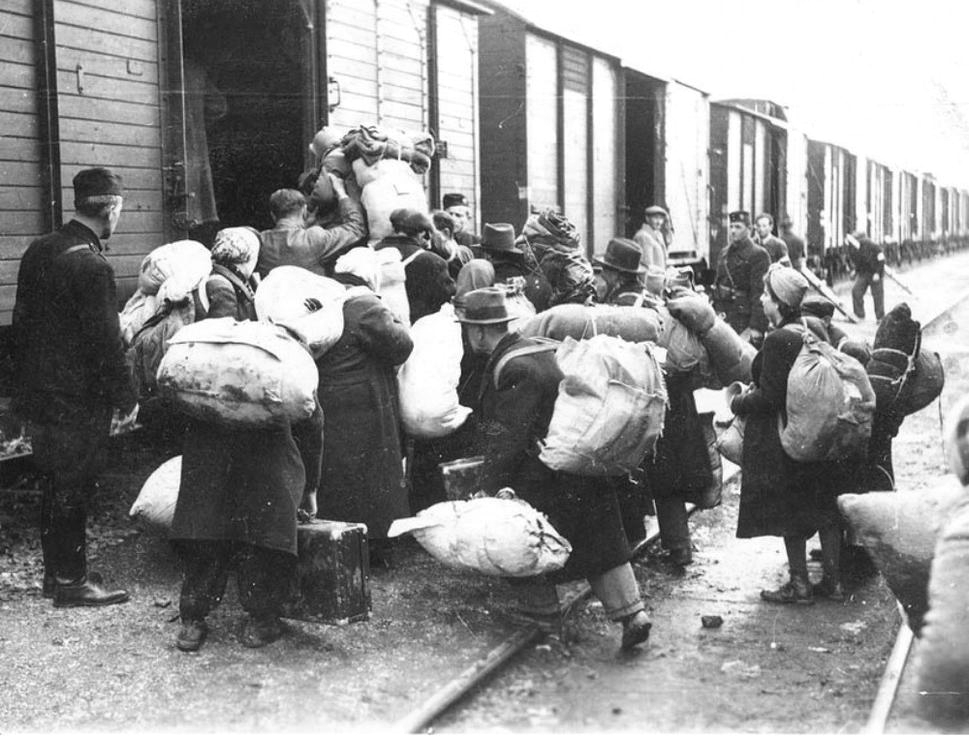
Deportations of Slovak Jews to concentration camp

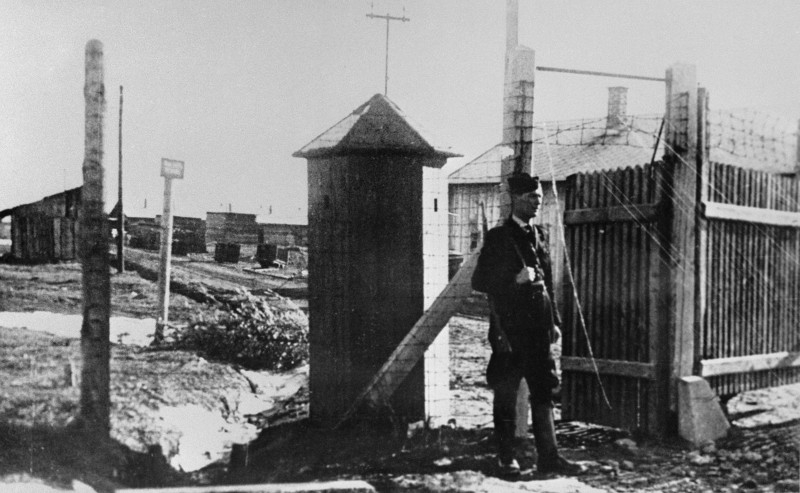
Labor camp in Nováky, the largest labor camp in Slovakia, held 1,600 Jewish prisoners.

The Slovak Republic was one of the countries that agreed to deport its Jews as part of the Nazi Final Solution. Initially, the Slovak government tried to make a deal with Germany in October 1941 to deport its Jews as a substitute for providing Slovak workers to help the war effort. After the Wannsee Conference, the Germans agreed to the Slovak proposal, and a deal was reached where the Slovak Republic would pay for each Jew deported, and, in return, Germany promised that the Jews would never return to the republic. The initial terms were for "20,000 young, strong Jews", but the Slovak government quickly agreed to a German proposal to deport the entire population for "evacuation to territories in the East" meaning to Auschwitz-Birkenau. The Slovak Republic paid Germany 500 RM per every deported Jew for "retraining and accommodation" (a similar but smaller payment of 30 RM was paid by Croatia).

The deportations of Jews from Slovakia started on 25 March 1942 but halted on 20 October 1942 after a group of Jewish citizens, led by Gisi Fleischmann and Rabbi Michael Ber Weissmandl, built a coalition of concerned officials from the Vatican and the government, and, through a mix of bribery and negotiation, was able to stop the process. By then, however, some 58,000 Jews had already been deported, primarily to Auschwitz. Slovak government officials filed complaints against Germany when it became clear that Germany had gassed many of the previously deported Slovak Jews in mass executions.

In August 1942, after the majority of Slovak Jews had been sent to German-occupied Poland and it became clear that the deportees were being systematically murdered, Tiso gave a speech in Holič in which he called for Slovaks to "cast off your parasite [the Jews]" and justified continuing deportations of Jews from Slovakia. On 30 August, Hitler commented "It is interesting how this little Catholic priest Tiso is sending us the Jews!". Vatican undersecretary Domenico Tardini complained: "Everyone understands that the Holy See cannot stop Hitler. But who can understand that it does not know how to rein in a priest?"

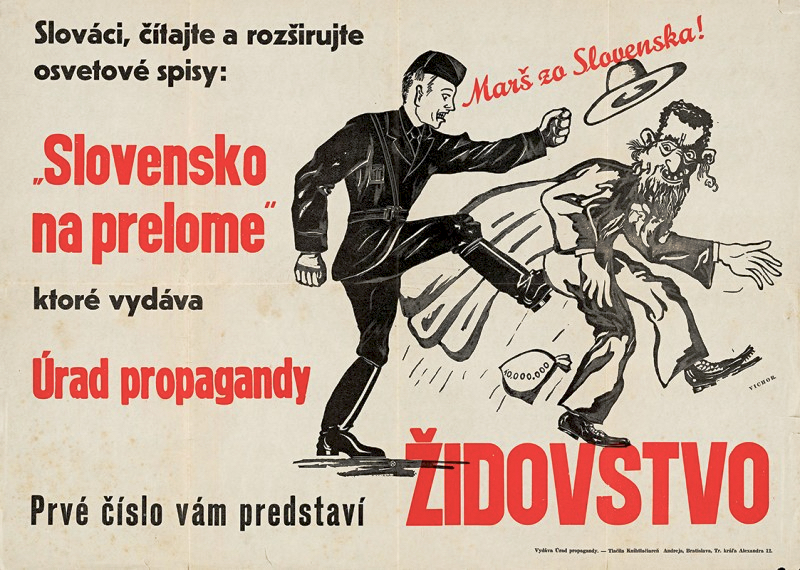
A Slovak propaganda poster, ordering Jews to "Get out of Slovakia!"

Jewish deportations resumed on 30 September 1944, when the Republic lost independence to a complete German occupation due to the Nazis' concern that the Soviet army had reached the Slovak border, and the Slovak National Uprising began. During the German occupation, another 13,500 Jews were deported, and 5,000 were imprisoned. Deportations continued until 31 March 1945. In all, German and Slovak authorities deported about 70,000 Jews from Slovakia; about 65,000 of them were murdered or died in concentration camps. The overall figures are inexact, partly because many Jews did not identify themselves.

By the end of the Holocaust, more than two-thirds of the Jews living in Slovakia had been murdered. Approximately 60,000 of the 95,000 Slovak Jews were deported by the Nazis and sent to death camps in German-occupied Poland before 1942. One 2006 estimate is that approximately 105,000 Slovak Jews, or 77% of their pre-war population, died during the war.

== Slovak National Uprising ==
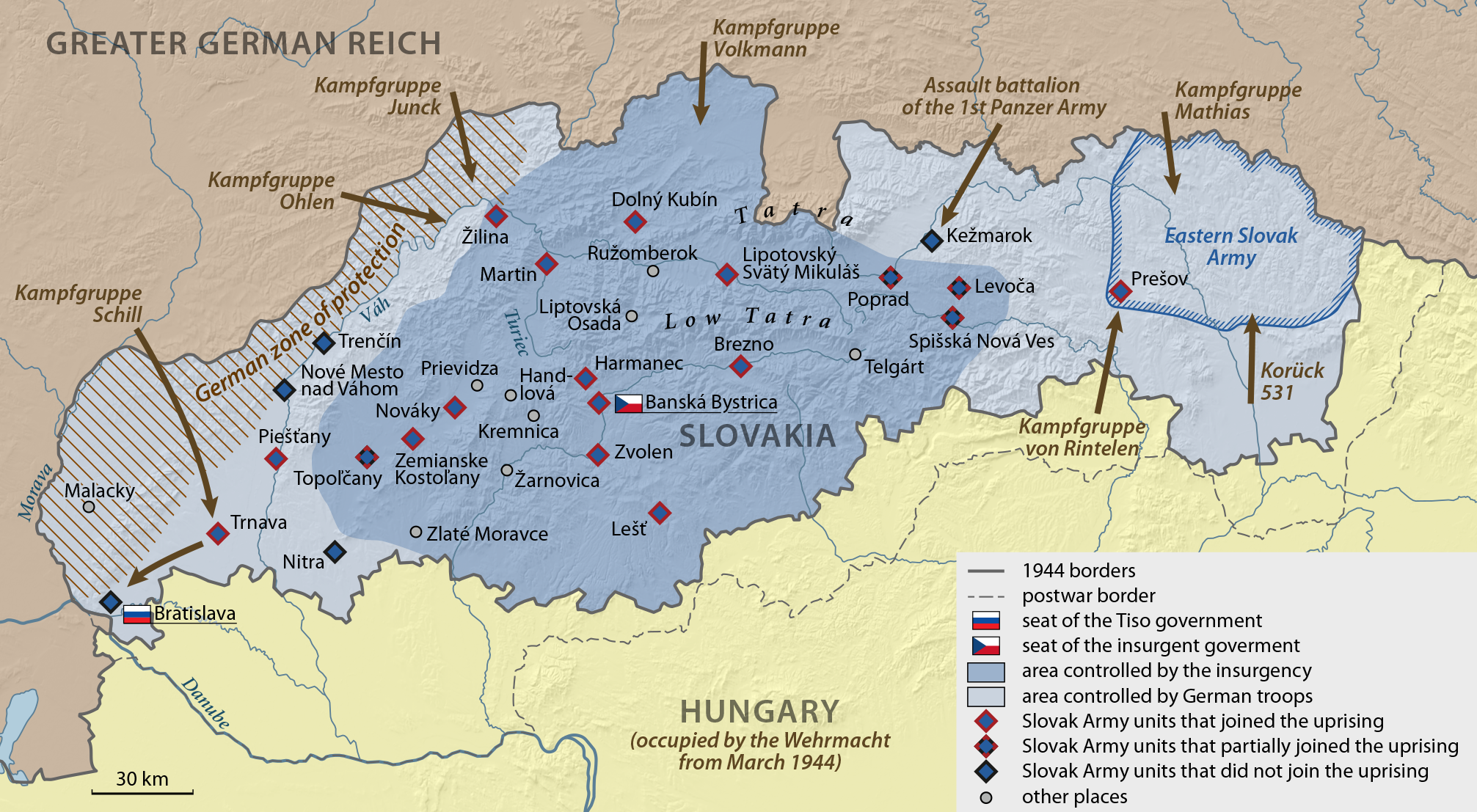
Map of the Slovak National Uprising in its first week. {The Slovak National Uprising 1944]. Slovart: Bratislava 2008

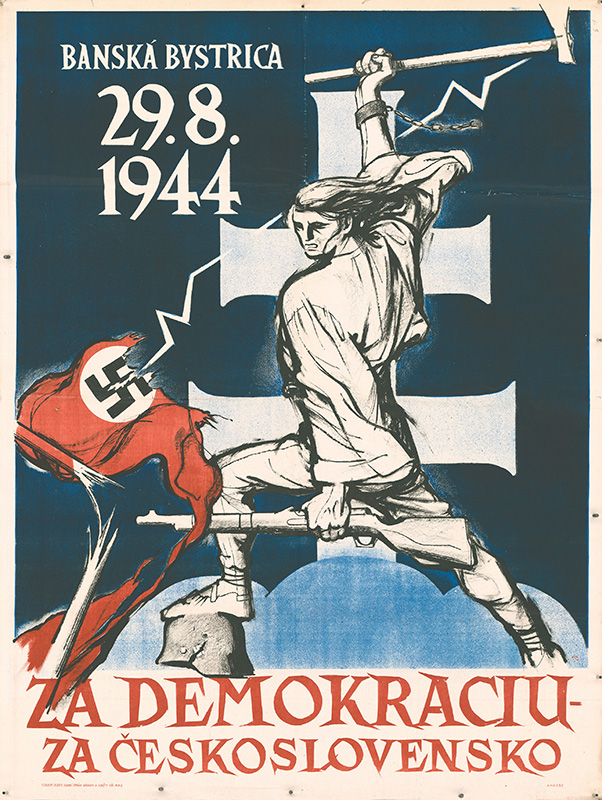
A Pro-Slovak National Uprising propaganda poster, "For democracy, for Czechoslovakia", 1944

In 1944, during the Slovak National Uprising, many Slovak units sided with the Slovak resistance and rebelled against Tiso's collaborationist government, while others helped German forces put the uprising down. On September 19, 1944, the German command replaced SS-Obergruppenführer Berger, who had previously commanded the troops fighting the Uprising, with SS-General Höfle. By that time the Germans had 48,000 soldiers in Slovakia: eight German divisions (including four of the Waffen-SS) and one pro-Nazi Slovak formation.

This resistance movement was represented mainly by members of the Democratic Party, social democrats, and communists. It was launched on 29 August 1944 from Banská Bystrica to resist German troops that had occupied Slovak territory and to overthrow the collaborationist government of Jozef Tiso. Although German forces largely defeated the resistance, guerrilla operations continued their efforts in the mountains.

In retaliation, Einsatzgruppe H and the Hlinka Guard Emergency Divisions executed many Slovaks suspected of aiding the rebels as well as Jews who had avoided deportation until then, and destroyed 93 villages on suspicion of collaboration. Several villages were burned to the ground, and all their inhabitants were murdered, as in Ostrý Grúň and Kľak (21 January 1945) or Kalište (18 March 1945). A later estimate of the death toll was 5,304, and authorities discovered 211 mass graves that resulted from those atrocities. The largest executions occurred in Kremnička (747 killed, mostly Jews and Roma) and Nemecká (900 killed).

The German victory in Slovakia only delayed the final fall of Tiso's pro-National Socialist regime. Six months later, the Red Army attacked the Axis forces in Slovakia. As early as December 1944, Romanian and Soviet troops confronted German troops in southern Slovakia as part of the Battle of Budapest (26 December to 13 February). On January 19, 1945, the Red Army occupied Bardejov, Svidník, Prešov and Košice in eastern Slovakia. On March 3–5 they took northwestern Slovakia. Soviet and Romanian troops liberated Banská Bystrica on 26 March 1945. Malinovsky's forces marched into Bratislava on 4 April 1945.

The Slovak National Uprising did not achieve its main military objectives due to the timing of the uprising and the actions of Soviet partisans, who often undermined the plans and objectives of the Slovak armed insurrection. If the uprising had occurred later, when Slovak preparations were complete, the Slovak resistance could theoretically have co-ordinated with the Allies and allowed the Red Army to move quickly through Slovakia (although it is questionable whether the Soviet leadership would have preferred such an option, as this would have significantly empowered democratic forces in Slovakia). Nevertheless, the activity of the guerrilla forces required Germany to deploy troops that could have otherwise strengthened the eastern front lines against the advancing fronts of Ukraine to the north and south of Slovakia.

== End ==
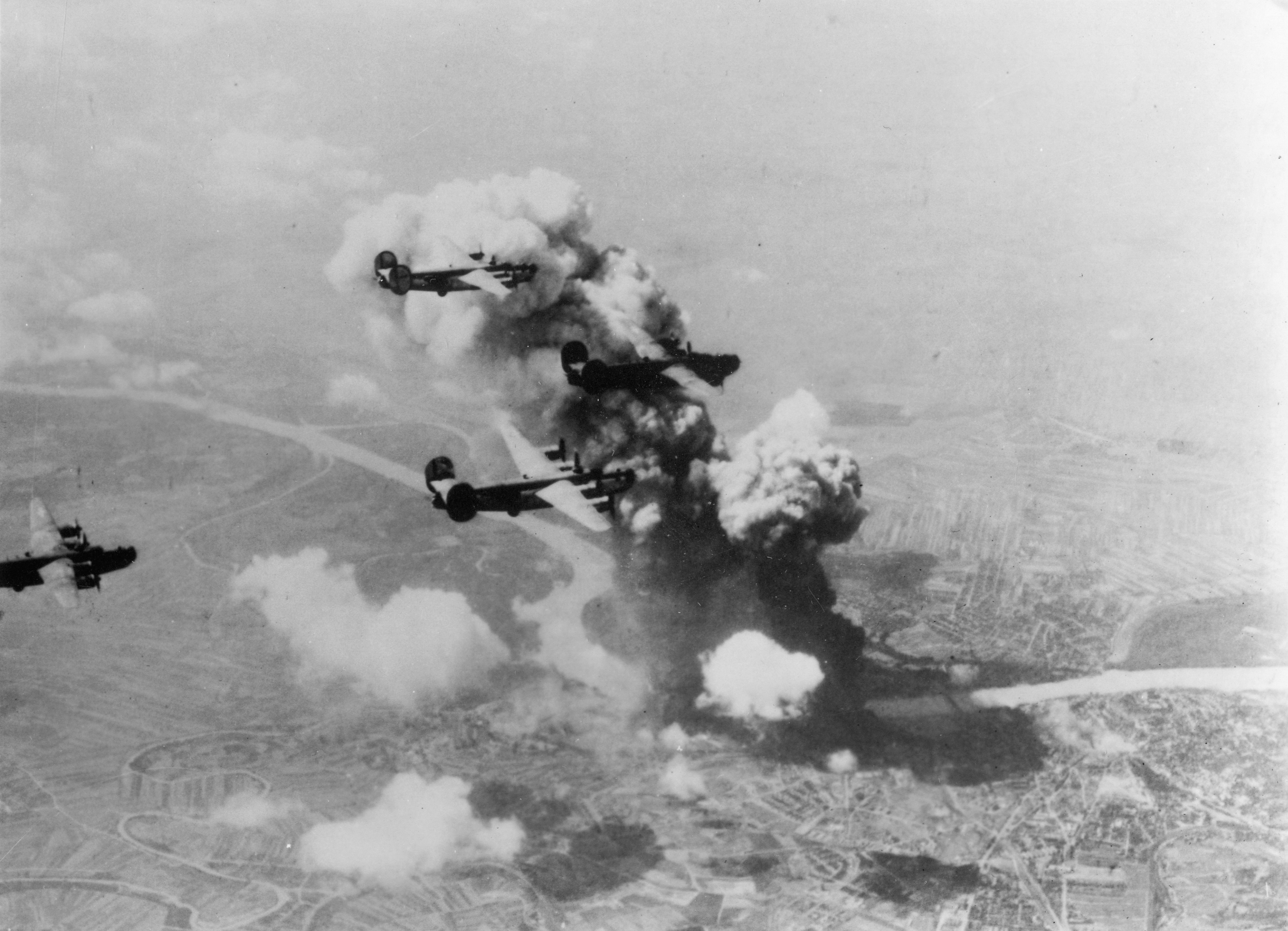
Bratislava was bombarded by the United States Army Air Forces, during the Nazi occupation in 1944.

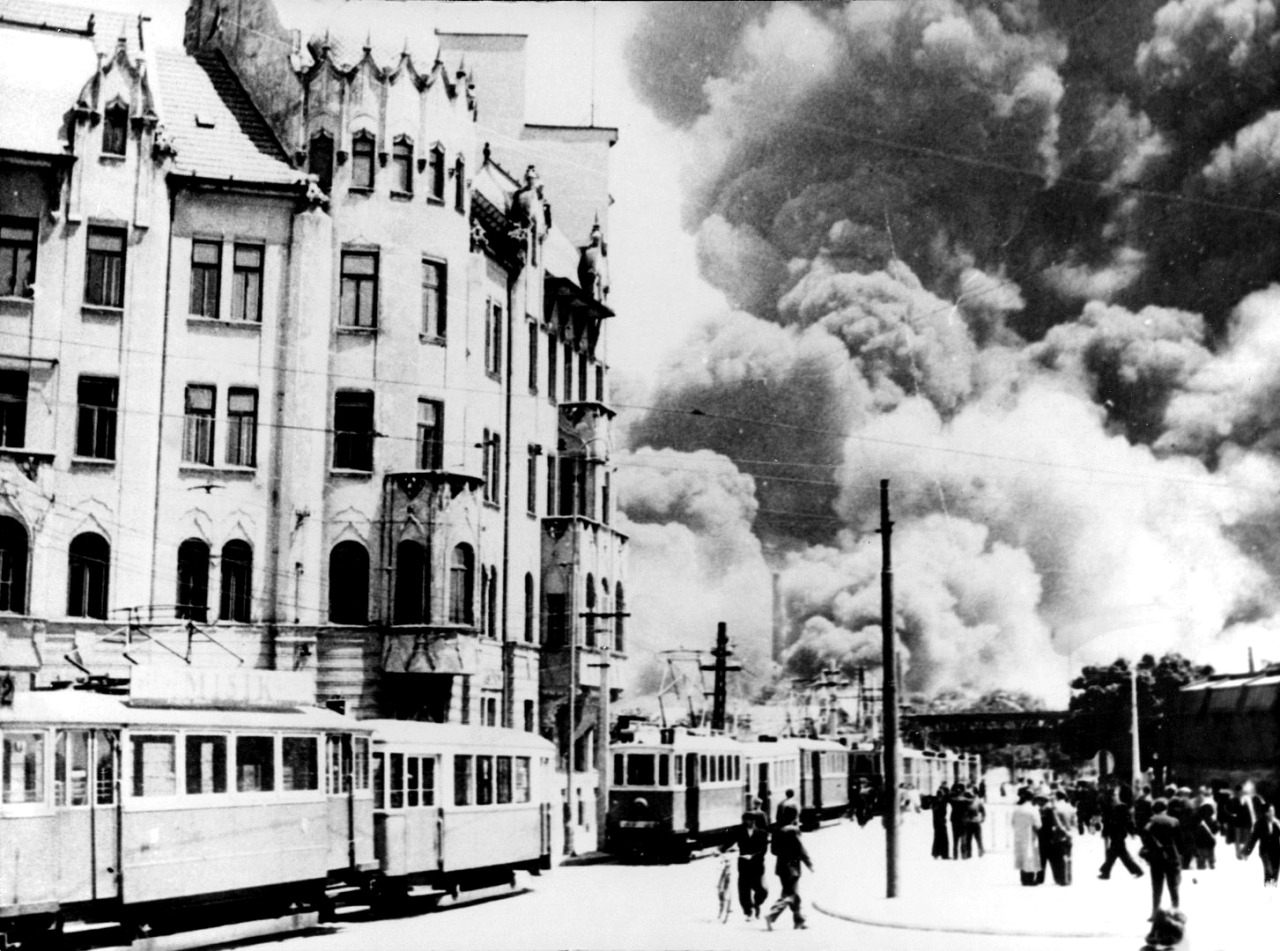
Allied bombing of Bratislava, 1944

=== Air warfare ===
Bratislava was often bombarded by the Allies. Major air raids included the bombing of Bratislava and its refinery Apollo on 16 June 1944 by American B-24 bombers of the Fifteenth Air Force with 181 victims. Bombardment group attacked in four waves with overall 158 planes.

The major targets of strategic bombing included oil refineries in Bratislava and Dubová (Banská Bystrica Region), arms factories in Dubnica nad Váhom and Považská Bystrica, railroad hubs like Nové Zámky. During the liberation months tactical bombing was executed, strongest hit were Prešov and Nitra.

Major air raid included the bombing of Bratislava and its refinery Apollo on June 16, 1944 by American B-24 bombers of the Fifteenth Air Force with 181 victims and bombing of Nitra on March 26, 1945 by Soviet A-20 bombers with 345 victims.

=== Occupations ===
After the anti-Nazi Slovak National Uprising in August 1944, the Germans occupied the country (from October 1944), which thereby lost much of its independence. The German troops were gradually pushed out by the Red Army, by Romanian, and by Czechoslovak soldiers coming from the east. The territories again became part of Czechoslovakia.

On 4 April 1945 the Soviet Army 2nd Ukrainian Front captured Bratislava during the Bratislava–Brno offensive and occupied all of Slovakia. The exiled Slovak government capitulated to General Walton Walker leading the XX Corps of the 3rd US Army on 8 May 1945 in the Austrian town of Kremsmünster. In the summer of 1945, the captured former president and members of the former government were handed over to Czechoslovak authorities.

Several prominent Slovak politicians escaped to neutral countries. Following his captivity, the deposed president Jozef Tiso authorized the former foreign minister Ferdinand Ďurčanský as his successor. Ďurčanský, Tiso's personal secretary Karol Murín, and cousin Fraňo Tiso were appointed by ex-president Tiso as the representatives of the Slovak nation; however, they failed to create a government-in-exile as no country recognized them. In the 1950s, fellow Slovak nationalists established the Slovak Action Committee (later Slovak Liberation Committee), which unsuccessfully advocated the restoration of the independent Slovak republic and the renewal of war against the Soviet Union. After the dissolution of Czechoslovakia and the creation of the modern Slovak republic, the Slovak Liberation Committee proclaimed Tiso's authorization as obsolete.

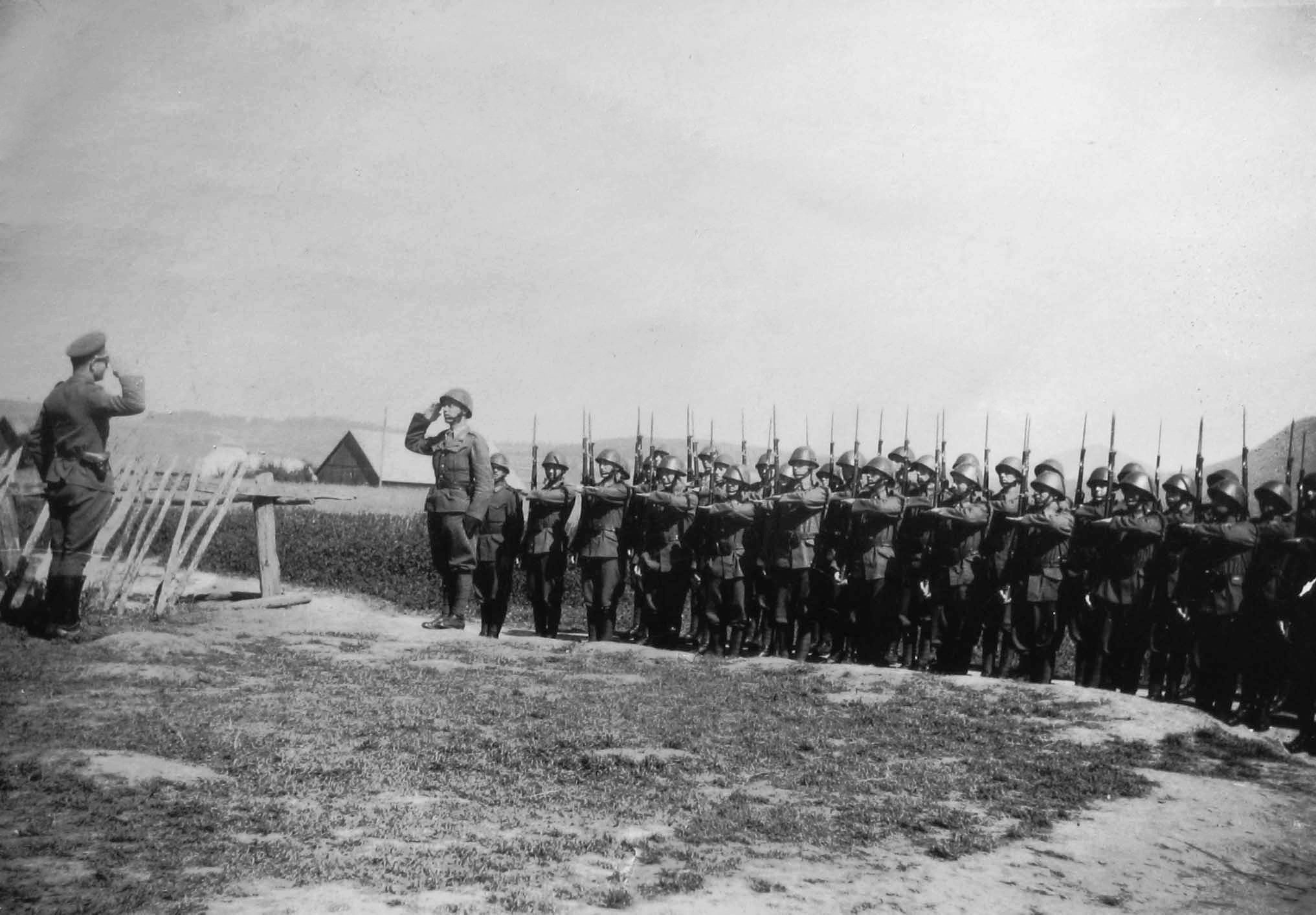
Troops of Slovak anti-Nazi resistance movement during the Slovak National Uprising in 1944

At the end of the war, Vojtech Tuka suffered a stroke which led him to use a wheelchair; he emigrated together with his wife, nursing attendants, and personal doctor to Austria, where he was arrested by Allied troops following the capitulation of Germany and handed over to the officials of the renewed Czechoslovakia. Following a brief trial, Vojtech Tuka was executed by hanging on 20 August 1946.

Jozef Tiso was sentenced to death, deprivation of his civil rights, and confiscation of all of his property. Tiso appealed to the Czechoslovak president Edvard Beneš and expected a reprieve; his prosecutor had recommended clemency. However, no reprieve was forthcoming. Wearing his clerical outfit, Tiso was hanged in Bratislava on 18 April 1947. The Czechoslovak government buried him secretly to avoid having his grave become a shrine, but far-right followers of Tiso soon identified the grave in the St Martin cemetery in Bratislava as his. Decades later, after a DNA test in April 2008 that confirmed it, the body of Tiso was exhumed and buried in St Emmeram's Cathedral in Nitra, in accordance with canon law.

== Legacy ==
Some Slovak nationalists, such as the People's Party Our Slovakia, celebrate March 14 as the anniversary of Slovak independence. However, January 1 (the date of the Velvet Divorce) is the official independence day of the modern Slovak Republic. The issue of March 14 commemorations divided the Christian Democratic Movement in the early 1990s.

Members of the far-right in admiration of Tiso created a memorial grave in Martin cemetery in October of 2008 to commemorate Tiso. It has since been used as an occasional gathering place for many far-right groups, including the People's Party Our Slovakia. Ultranationalist propaganda proclaims Tiso as a "martyr" who "sacrificed his life for his belief and nation" and so tries to paint him as an innocent victim of communism and a saint.

== In popular culture ==
=== Film ===
The Shop on Main Street is a 1965 Czechoslovak film about the Aryanization program during World War II in the Slovak Republic.

The film won the 1965 Academy Award for Best Foreign Language Film, and actress Ida Kamińska was nominated one year later for Best Actress in a Leading Role. It was entered into the 1965 Cannes Film Festival.

=== Television ===
In 2018, Slovak public broadcaster RTVS in the television poll The Greatest Slovak (spin-off of British television series 100 Greatest Britons), nominated Jozef Tiso, president of the wartime Slovak Republic, as one of the contenders for the title of the "Greatest Slovak". After criticism RTVS excluded Jozef Tiso.

== See also ==
- Axis powers
- Bombing of Bratislava in World War II
- Croatian–Romanian–Slovak friendship proclamation
- Czechoslovak government-in-exile
- The Holocaust in Slovakia
- Occupation of Czechoslovakia (1938–1945)
- Protectorate of Bohemia and Moravia
- Slovak National Uprising
- Slovakia
