= Krasnikov =

Krasnikov (Russian: Красников) is a Russian masculine surname; its feminine counterpart is Krasnikova. It may refer to:

- Natella Krasnikova (born 1953), Russian field hockey player
- Nikolay Krasnikov (1985–2025), Russian ice speedway rider
- Nikolay Petrovich Krasnikov (1921–20??), Russian philosopher, historian and religious scholar
- Sergey Krasnikov (born 1961), Russian physicist
  - Krasnikov tube, a speculative mechanism for space travel
- Yana Krasnikova (born 1999), Ukrainian model and beauty pageant titleholder
