= Maria Butinova =

Soviet and Russian ethnographer, historian and religious scholar (1920-2007)

Maria Sidorovna Butinova (Russian: Мария Сидоровна Бутинова), née Dolgonosova, (Russian: Долгоносова; 19 November 1920, in Millerovo – 2007) was a Soviet and Russian ethnographer, historian, and religious scholar. As a doctor of historical sciences, she was a specialist in the field of religion of Oceania.

== Biography ==
From the working-class family, husband – N. A. Butinov, ethnographer. From 1938 to 1942, she was a student of the Department of Ethnography of the Faculty of Philology of the Leningrad State University. From September 1941 to February 1942, she worked in a military hospital during the Siege of Leningrad. In 1942, she and the university were evacuated to Saratov. From 1942 to 1945 she was a graduate student at the Leningrad State University. From 1945 to 1949, Butinova was a teacher at the Oriental faculty of the Leningrad State University. In 1948, Butinova received a Candidate of Sciences degree, having defended a dissertation at the Institute of Ethnography of the USSR Academy of Sciences on the theme "E. Tylor's Doctrine of Remnants". From 1949 to 1952, she was a teacher at the Faculty of History of the Leningrad State University. In 1951, she took part in the creation of a permanent exhibition at the Museum of Anthropology and Ethnography entitled "Peoples of Australia and Oceania". In 1952, Butinova went to work at the Museum of the History of Religion and Atheism of the USSR Academy of Sciences, where she worked until 1991. By 1952, she was a research fellow. From 1953 to 1962, Butinova was a scientific secretary. Since 1961, she was a senior research fellow. From 1960 to 1961 she was acting museum director. From 1968 to 1983, Butinova was a head of the origin of religion department of the Museum of the History of Religion and Atheism. In 1975, Butinova defended her doctoral dissertation on the topic "Missionaryism and Colonialism (based on materials from the peoples of Oceania)."

Butinova died in 2007.

== Selected works ==
- Бутинова, Мария Сидоровна. О преодолении религиозных пережитков в сознании людей (On Overcoming Religious Vestiges in the Minds of People)/ Канд. ист. наук М. С. Бутинова; Всесоюз. о-во по распространению полит. и науч. знаний. Ленинград. отд-ние. - Ленинград : [б. и.], 1956. - 43 с.;
- Бутинова, Мария Сидоровна. Миссионерство и колониализм : (По материалам народов Океании) : Автореф. дис. на соиск. учен. степени д-ра ист. наук : (07.00.07) / АН СССР. Ин-т этнографии им. Н. Н. Миклухо-Маклая. - Москва : [б. и.], 1975. - 26 с.
- Бутинова, Мария Сидоровна. «Естествознание и религия» («Natural History and Religion»): Справочник-путеводитель / Акад. наук СССР. Музей истории религии и атеизма. - Москва; Ленинград : Изд-во Акад. наук СССР, 1957. - 45 с. : ил.;
- Бутинова, Мария Сидоровна. «Как возникла религия» («How Religion Came About»). - Москва : Сов. Россия, 1957. - 103 с., 2 л. ил. : ил.;
  - Как возникла религия (How Religion Came About). - 2-е изд., испр. и доп. - Москва : Сов. Россия, 1958. - 112 с., 4 л. ил. : ил.;
  - Как возникла религия (How Religion Came About). / М.С. Бутинова. - Москва : Сов. Россия, 1977. - 140 с. : ил.;
- Бутинова, Мария Сидоровна. Притыкин Яков (Зальм) Максимович (Менделеевич). «Наука и религия» («Science and Religion»): Краткий справочник-путеводитель / Сост. М. С. Бутинова и Я. М. Притыкин; Акад. наук СССР. Музей истории религии и атеизма. - Москва; Ленинград : Изд-во Акад. наук СССР. [Ленингр. отд-ние], 1961. - 108 с. : ил.;
- Бутинова, Мария Сидоровна. Гревенс, Наталья Николаевна. «Происхождение религии» («Origin of Religion»): Краткий справочник-путеводитель / Сост. М. С. Бутинова и Н. Н. Гревенс; Акад. наук СССР. М-во культуры РСФСР. Гос. музей истории религии и атеизма. - Москва; Ленинград : Изд-во Акад. наук СССР. [Ленингр. отд-ние], 1962. - 74 с., 1 л. ил. : ил.;
- Бутинова, Мария Сидоровна. Красников, Николай Петрович. «Музей истории религии и атеизма» («Museum of the History of Religion and Atheism»): Справочник-путеводитель / М. С. Бутинова, Н. П. Красников; Акад. наук СССР. М-во культуры РСФСР. Музей истории религии и атеизма. - Москва; Ленинград : Наука. (Ленингр. отд-ние), 1965. - 195 с. : ил.;
- Бутинова, Мария Сидоровна. Миссионерство и колониализм в Океании (Missionary and Colonialism in Oceania). - Ленинград : [б. и.], 1975. - 165 с.; 21 см. - (Актуальные проблемы истории религии и атеизма : Сборник науч. трудов / Гос. музей истории религии и атеизма М-ва культуры РСФСР; Вып. 2).
- Бутинова, Мария Сидоровна. Миссионерство и колониализм (Missionary and Colonialism): по материалам народов Океании : диссертация ... доктора исторических наук : 07.00.07. - Ленинград, 1975. - 370 с.
