= Nikolay Petrovich Krasnikov =

Soviet academic (born 1921)

Nikolay Petrovich Krasnikov (Russian: Николай Петрович Красников; born November 1921, Buzuluk) was active in Soviet academia as a philosopher, historian, and religious scholar.

== Early life ==
Krasnikov graduated from high school in Leningrad in 1940. He was released from military service due to poor eyesight. During World War II, he worked as a mechanic at a repair plant. In addition, he dug trenches for anti-aircraft gunners on the Field of Mars. In 1942, he graduated from Leningrad School of Military Communications and was sent to the 12th Front Railway Park of the North Caucasian Front as a senior equipment repair technician. He served in the railway units on the Ukrainian Front. From August to September 1945 Krasnikov served in the railway units on the Transbaikal Front. He was an adjutant of the brigade commander, assistant chief of staff, komsorg (Komsomol organizer) of the battalion and assistant chief of the political department for the Komsomol. For participation in the liberation of the Taman Peninsula in the autumn of 1943 he was awarded the Medal "For Battle Merit".

In July 1944 he was awarded the Order of the Red Star for his participation in the liberation of Kerch and Sevastopol. He was awarded the Order of the Patriotic War, 2st class. Krasnikov has medals "For the Victory over Germany in the Great Patriotic War 1941–1945", "For Valiant Labor in the Great Patriotic War 1941–1945", etc.

In 1952 Krasnikov graduated from Leningrad State University, in 1961 he graduated from the Academy of Social Sciences under the Central Committee of the CPSU. In 1961, Krasnikov earned a Candidate of Sciences degree, having defended a dissertation on the theme "Strengthening the Alliance of the Working Class and the Collective Farm Peasantry in the Struggle of the Communist Party for the Steep Rise of Agriculture (1956–1958)".

== Career ==
From 1961 to 1969 he was the director of the Leningrad Museum of the History of Religion and Atheism. In 1969 he moved to Moscow. From 1969 to 1991 he worked at the Institute of Scientific Atheism of the Academy of Social Sciences. In 1976, Krasnikov defended his doctoral dissertation on the topic "Socio-Ethical Views of Russian Orthodoxy: (Critical Analysis)". Krasnikov is the author of many scientific works.

== Works ==
- Красников, Николай Петрович. «Укрепление союза рабочего класса и колхозного крестьянства в борьбе Коммунистической партии за крутой подъем сельского хозяйства (1956–1958 гг.)» («Strengthening the Alliance of the Working Class and the Collective Farm Peasantry in the Struggle of the Communist Party for the Steep Rise of Agriculture (1956–1958)»): Автореферат дис. на соискание ученой степени кандидата исторических наук / Акад. обществ. наук при ЦК КПСС. Кафедра истории КПСС. - Москва : Изд-во ВПШ и АОН, 1961. - 18 с.;
- Красников, Николай Петрович. «Уметь бороться с религией» («Be Able to Fight Religion»)/ Н. П. Красников, канд. ист. наук. - Москва : [б. и.], 1971. - 38 с.; 20 см. - (В помощь лектору/ О-во "Знание" РСФСР. Науч.-метод. совет по пропаганде науч. атеизма).
- Красников, Николай Петрович. «Государственный музей истории религии и атеизма» («State Museum of the History of Religion and Atheism»): (Материалы в помощь лектору) / О-во "Знание" УССР. Науч.-метод. кабинет. - Киев : [б. и.], 1963. - 20 с.;
- Красников, Николай Петрович. «Социалистические государства и церковь» («Socialist States and the Church»): (об установлении новых отношений между государством и церковью в некоторых европейских странах народной демократии) / канд. ист. наук Н. П. Красников; О-во "Знание" РСФСР. Ленинградское отд-ние. - Ленинград : [б. и.], 1964. - 52 с.;
- Красников, Николай Петрович. «Церковь приспосабливается» («The Church is Adjusting»)/ Канд. ист. наук Н. П. Красников; О-во "Знание РСФСР. Ленингр. организация. - Ленинград : [б. и.], 1965. - 35 с.;
- Бутинова, Мария Сидоровна. Красников, Николай Петрович/ «Музей истории религии и атеизма» («Museum of the History of Religion and Atheism»): Справочник-путеводитель / М. С. Бутинова, Н. П. Красников; Акад. наук СССР. М-во культуры РСФСР. Музей истории религии и атеизма. - Москва; Ленинград : Наука. (Ленингр. отд-ние), 1965. - 195 с. : ил.;
- «Вопросы преодоления религиозных пережитков в СССР» («Questions of Overcoming Religious Vestiges in the USSR»): [Сборник статей] / АН СССР. М-во культуры РСФСР. Музей истории религии и атеизма; [Ред. коллегия: Н. П. Красников (отв. ред.) и др.]. - Москва; Ленинград : Наука. [Ленингр. отд-ние], 1966. - 298 с., 1 л. портр.;
- Красников, Николай Петрович. «Ленинский декрет об отделении церкви от государства и его международное значение» («Lenin Decree on the Separation of the Church from the State and its International Importance»)/ Канд. ист. наук Н. П. Красников. - Ленинград : [б. и.], 1967. - 20 с.; 21 см. - (Методическое пособие в помощь лектору. К 50-летию Советской власти/ О-во "Знание" РСФСР. Ленингр. организация).
- «По этапам развития атеизма в СССР» («On the Stages of the Development of Atheism in the USSR»): [Сборник статей] / АН СССР. М-во культуры РСФСР. Музей истории религии и атеизма; [Отв. ред. Н. П. Красников]. - Ленинград : Наука. Ленингр. отд-ние, 1967. - 331 с. : ил.;
- Красников, Николай Петрович. «В погоне за веком : (Отражение социальных процессов в богословских трудах и проповеднической деятельности православных священнослужителей)» (In Pursuit of a Century: (Reflection of Social Processes in Theological Works and the Preaching Activities of Orthodox Clergy)). - Москва : Политиздат, 1968. - 160 с.;
- Красников, Николай Петрович. «Критический обзор религиозной литературы» («Critical Review of Religious Literature»)/ Н. П. Красников. - Москва : [б. и.], 1970. - 20 с.; 20 см. - (Методический материал в помощь лектору/ Моск. гор. организация о-ва "Знание" РСФСР. Моск. дом. науч. атеизма).
- Красников, Николай Петрович. «Политическая и социальная переориентация русской православной церкви» («Political and Social Reorientation of the Russian Orthodox Church»): Метод. материал в помощь лектору / Дом. полит. просвещения мордов. обкома КПСС. Мордов. организация о-ва "Знание". - Саранск : Морд. кн. изд-во, 1973. - 15 с.;
- Красников, Николай Петрович. «Социально-этические воззрения русского православия : (Критич. анализ)» («Socio-Ethical Views of Russian Orthodoxy: (Critical Analysis)»): Автореферат дис. на соискание ученой степени доктора философских наук. (09.00.06) / АОН при ЦК КПСС. - Москва : [б. и.], 1976. - 52 с.
- Красников, Николай Петрович. «Социально-этические воззрения русского православия : критический анализ» («Socio-Ethical Views of Russian Orthodoxy: (Critical Analysis)»): диссертация ... доктора философских наук : 09.00.06. - Москва, 1976. - 452 с.
- Красников, Николай Петрович. «История, культура и атеистическое воспитание» («History, Culture and Atheist Education»)/ Н. П. Красников, К. К. Степин. - М. : о-во "Знание" РСФСР, 1981. - 39 с.; 20 см. - (В помощь лектору. / О-во "Знание" РСФСР, Науч.-метод. совет по пропаганде науч. атеизма).
- Красников, Николай Петрович. «Критический обзор социально-этического содержания "Журнала Московской патриархии" за 1979–1980 гг.» («A Critical Review of the Socio-Ethical Content of the Journal of the Moscow Patriarchate for 1979–1980.»)/ Н. П. Красников. - М. : Б. и., 1981 (вып. дан. 1982). - 48 с.;
- Красников, Николай Петрович. «Мораль без будущего : (Нравств. прогресс, атеизм, религия)» («Morality Without a Future: (Moral Progress, Atheism, Religion)»)/ Н. Красников. - М. : Моск. рабочий, 1984. - 94 с.; 20 см. - (Беседы о религии).
- Красников, Николай Петрович. «Эволюция социально-этических воззрений русского православия» («The Evolution of Socio-Ethical Views of Russian Orthodoxy»): (Критич. анализ) / Н. П. Красников. - М. : Знание, 1986. - 62,[2] с.; 20 см. - (Новое в жизни, науке, технике. Науч. атеизм;
- Красников, Николай Петрович. «Православная этика: прошлое и настоящее» («Orthodox Ethics: Past and Present»)/ Н. П. Красников. - М. : Политиздат, 1981. - 96 с.;
- Красников, Николай Петрович. «Социально-этические воззрения русского православия в XX веке» («Social and Ethical Views of Russian Orthodoxy in the XX Century»)/ Н. П. Красников. - Киев : Выща шк., 1988. - 177,[2] с.; 21 см.; ISBN 5-11-001245-8
- Красников, Николай Петрович. «Русское православие : история, современность» («Russian Orthodoxy: History, Modernity») / Н. П. Красников. - М. : Моск. рабочий, 1988. - 75,[2] с.; 17 см. - (Сер. "Позиция").; ISBN 5-239-00530-3 :
- Красников, Николай Петрович. «Русское православие, государство и культура : (Ист. аспект)» («Russian Orthodoxy, State and Culture: (Historical Aspect»))/ Н. П. Красников. - М. : Знание, 1989. - 62,[1] с.; 20 см. - (12/1989).; ISBN 5-07-000841-2
