= Constitution of Slovakia (1939) =

The Constitution of Slovakia (Slovak: Ústava Slovenska), was the former constitution of the Slovak Republic. It was voted by the National Assembly, and came into effect on 21 July 1939.

== History ==
Following the Munich Agreement, the Slovak State was given autonomy within Czechoslovakia. In 1939, they declared independence at the urging of Nazi Germany. The Slovak Parliament met and voted through a constitution for the newly renamed Slovak Republic on 21 July. It was noted by outside observers to have been heavily influenced by the German minority in Slovakia. The constitution was based upon the Austrofascist constitution of the Federal State of Austria. At first glance it appeared that the constitution contained separation of powers with the President of Slovakia being term limited and an elected National Assembly. However, the constitution granted the State Council, dominated by Hlinka's Slovak People's Party, the sole right to select parliamentary candidates in elections. As a result, they always selected Slovak People's Party members as candidates to turn the Slovak State into a de facto one-party state. President Jozef Tiso used the constitution to make the Slovak State into a puppet of Nazi Germany under the German Zone of Protection in Slovakia. The constitution granted recognition of "national groups" and granted extraterritorial jurisdiction over them by their "mother state", which would later become a regular demand from Nazi Germany over all their subsequent occupied and puppet states.

During the Second World War, following the Bratislava–Brno offensive, the Slovak State surrendered and was subsumed as a part of Czechoslovakia again and the old 1920 Czechoslovak Constitution overrode the Slovak constitution.

== See also ==
- Constitution of Slovakia
- Constitutional Court of Slovakia
