= Ukrainian Front =

Ukrainian Front may refer to several Soviet fronts of the Russian Civil War and the World War II:

- Ukrainian Front (1919), formerly the Army Group of Kursk Direction
- Ukrainian Front (1939) formed during the Polish September Campaign
- 1st Ukrainian Front, renamed from Voronezh Front on October 20, 1943
- 2nd Ukrainian Front, renamed from Steppe Front on October 20, 1943
- 3rd Ukrainian Front, renamed from Southwestern Front on October 20, 1943
- 4th Ukrainian Front, formed in late 1943.
