= Antisemitism in Europe =

Antisemitism, prejudice or discrimination against Jews, has existed since the ancient times. While antisemitism had already been prevalent in ancient Greece and the Roman Empire, its institutionalization in European Christianity after the destruction of the ancient Jewish cultural center in Jerusalem led to centuries of intermittent segregations, expulsions and pogroms, culminating in the 20th-century genocide known as the Holocaust in Nazi German-occupied European states, where approximately 67% of all European Jews were murdered.

== Middle ages ==
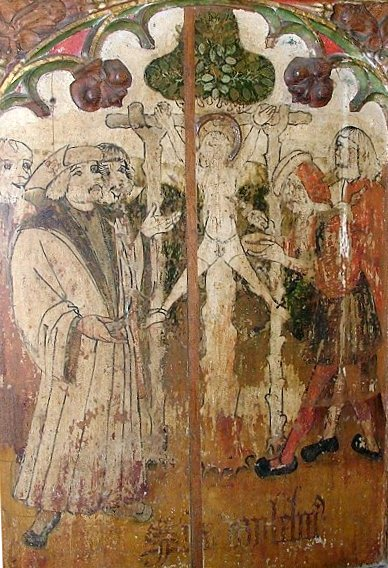
A painting in Holy Trinity church in Loddon, Norfolk depicting the first known case of blood libel dating back to 1144

Antisemitism in Europe in the Middle Ages was largely influenced by the Christian belief that the Jewish people were collectively responsible for the death of Jesus through the so-called blood curse of Pontius Pilate in the Gospels. Persecutions against Jews were widespread during the Crusades, beginning in 1095, when a number of communities, especially in France and the Rhineland, were massacred.

On many occasions, Jews were accused of the ritual murder of Christian children in what were called blood libels. The first known blood libel was the story of William of Norwich (d. 1144), whose murder sparked accusations of ritual murder and torture by the local Jews. The Black Death which devastated Europe in the 14th century also gave rise to widespread persecution. In the face of the terrifying spread of the plague, the Jews served as scapegoats and were accused of poisoning the wells. Many Jewish communities in western and central Europe were destroyed in a wave of violence between 1348 and 1350. For example, some two thousand Jews were massacred by burning in Strasbourg, in February 1349, upon a decision by the city council, before the plague had reached the city. In the German states a total of approximately 300 Jewish communities were destroyed during this period, because of Jews being killed or driven out.

Another aspect of medieval antisemitism was the many restrictions imposed on the Jews. They were excluded from many occupations because of the fear of competition with the local population. For the most part, they could not own land, since, under the feudal system, the pledge of loyalty required from a vassal upon the enfeoffment of land had the form of a Christian oath; however, there were exceptions. Their residence in cities was often limited to specific areas known as ghettos. Following the Fourth Lateran Council, in 1215, Jews were also ordered to wear distinctive clothing, in some instances a circular badge. Some Jews managed to evade the humiliating requirement of wearing a badge by bribing the local authorities.

In the later Middle Ages, Jews were expelled from smaller and larger regions across western Europe as well as the German lands, including monarchy-wide expulsions from England, in 1290, and France, in 1306 and 1394. The greatest expulsions of Jews were in Spain (1492) and Portugal (1496), where Jews were ordered to convert to Christianity, or to leave the country within six or eleven months, respectively.

The Protestant Reformation saw a rise of antisemitism with Martin Luther's On the Jews and Their Lies.

== Early modern period ==
The Renaissance, Enlightenment and imperialist eras led to a series of increasingly xenophobic and non-religious expressions of antisemitic phobias and outrages, even as much of the continent had experienced significant political reformation.

In western Europe, Jews were largely limited by local monarchs, especially as a consequence of the growing fear of competition with the local merchants due to the fact that the main occupation of Jews was commerce and banking. Notable examples are the limitation of the number of Jews allowed to settle in Breslau issued by Frederick II of Prussia in 1744 and the banishment of Jews from Bohemia by the archduchess of Austria Maria Theresa, who later also stated that Jews had to pay for remaining in the country.

With the development of the banking system and the need of rulers for financing their growing state apparatus, the term "Court Jew" was used in some western European states. The court Jews were businessmen and bankers who received privileges from the sovereign and acted as their treasurers and tax collectors.

In many cases, the court Jews obtained significant power as the "right hand" of the sovereign; in other cases, the court Jews were blamed for the financial problems of the states or when the sovereign lost his power. One notable court Jew was Joseph Süß Oppenheimer (1698–1738) the financial planner for Duke Karl Alexander of Württemberg in Stuttgart. Oppenheimer was executed after the death of the Duke and his story was used by Nazi propaganda.

Most of Europe's Jewish population was concentrated in central and eastern Europe within the borders of the Polish–Lithuanian Commonwealth. The Jews of Poland had been granted an unprecedented degree of religious and cultural autonomy since the Statute of Kalisz in 1264, which was ratified by subsequent Kings of Poland and the Commonwealth. Nevertheless, the Cossack uprising of Bohdan Khmelnytsky in Polish-controlled Ukraine (1648) devastated many Jewish communities and tens of thousands of Jews were massacred, expelled, or sold as slaves by Khmelnytsky's Tartar allies. Between 1648 and 1656, tens of thousands of Jews—given the lack of reliable data, it is impossible to establish more accurate figures—were killed by the rebels, and to this day the Khmelnytsky uprising is considered by Jews to be one of the most traumatic events in their history.

Following the Partitions of Poland by Russia, Prussia, and Austria at the end of the 18th century, most Polish Jews found themselves under Russian rule. In order to restrict the Jews from spreading throughout the Russian Empire and to protect Russian merchants from competition, the Pale of Settlement was established in 1772 by the empress of Russia Catherine II, restricting Jews to the western parts of the empire with the exception of a number of Jews who received permission to live in major cities, such as Kiev and Moscow.

== Late modern period ==
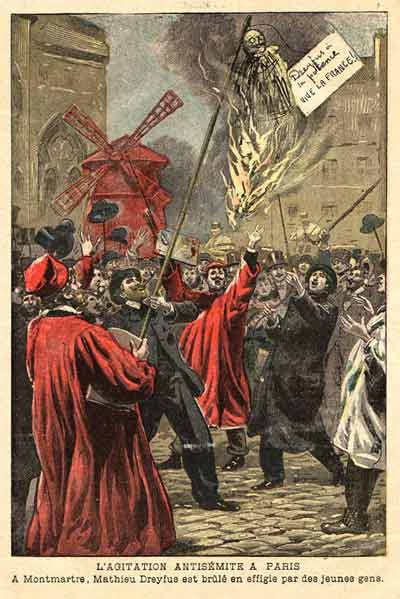
Antisemitic agitators in Paris burn an effigy of Mathieu Dreyfus during the Dreyfus affair.

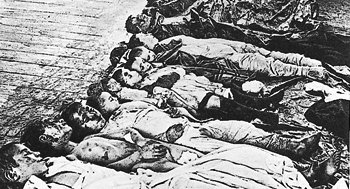
Photo believed to show the victims, mostly Jewish children, of a 1905 pogrom in Yekaterinoslav (today's Dnipro)

By the end of the 19th century racial antisemitism had begun to develop in Europe. It started as a part of a broader racist world view and belief of superiority of the "white race" over other "races", while existing prejudice was supported by pseudo-scientific theories such as Social Darwinism.

The main idea of racial antisemitism, as presented by racial theorists such as Joseph Arthur de Gobineau, is that the Jews are a distinct and inferior race compared to the European nations. The emphasis was on the non-European origin and culture of the Jews, meaning they were beyond redemption even if they converted to Christianity. This modern antisemitism emphasized hatred of the Jews as a race and not only due to their Jewish religion. The rise of modern antisemitism together with the rise of nationalism and the nation state brought a wave of antisemitism as Jews struggled to gain their rights as equal citizens. In Germany, this brought up the Hep-Hep riots in 1819 when the Jews of Bavaria were attacked for claiming their civic rights.

One of the most famous examples of the 19th century was the Dreyfus affair, when a French officer of Jewish origin, Alfred Dreyfus, was accused of high treason in 1894. The trial sparked a wave of antisemitism in France: eventually Dreyfus was found innocent of the charges in 1906. The affair greatly inspired Theodor Herzl.

In Eastern Europe, religious antisemitism remained influential as the Industrial Revolution affected those areas less. During the 19th century and the beginning of the 20th century, a number of pogroms occurred in Russia, sparked by various variables such as antisemitic political movements, the assassination of Tsar Alexander II in 1881 and blood libels about Jews killing Christian children. The most famous blood libel was the Beilis affair which took place in Kiev in 1913 when a local Jew was found innocent from accusations of killing a Christian boy.

Another example of modern antisemitism in Europe was the conspiracy theory of Jewish world economic domination, as presented in the hoax The Protocols of the Elders of Zion which was first published in Russia in 1903 and became known outside Russia after the Russian Revolution of 1917. This theory was strengthened by the leading part Jews like the Rothschild family played in the European banking system. The pogroms in 1881 and after the first Russian Revolution of 1905 cost thousands of Jewish lives and more than a million migrated to America. The second Russian revolution and the civil war that came afterwards sparked a new wave of pogroms against the Jews as nationalist militias and regular armies fought over the control of the country. The casualties from the pogroms were estimated in tens of thousands dead.

== The Holocaust ==
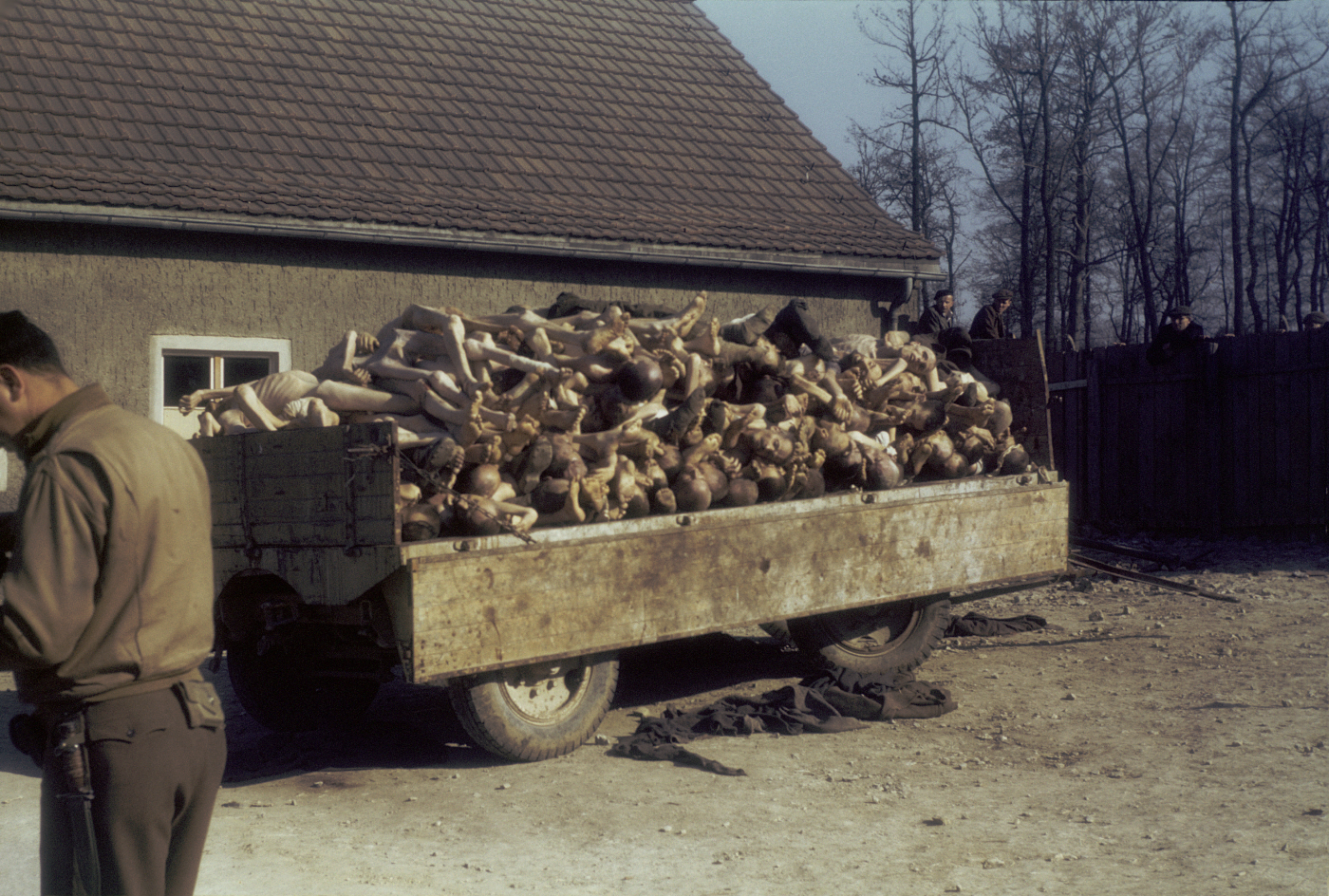
A wagon piled high with corpses outside the crematorium in the newly liberated Buchenwald concentration camp, 1945

The Holocaust was among the most significant events in modern Jewish history and one of the largest genocides in history. Approximately six million Jews were murdered by the Nazis, accounting for roughly two-thirds of all European Jews.

By the early 20th century, the Jews of Germany were the most integrated Jews in Europe. Their situation changed in the early 1930s after the German defeat in World War I and the economic crisis of 1929, which resulted in the rise of the Nazis and their explicitly antisemitic program. Hate speech which referred to Jewish citizens as "dirty Jews" became common in antisemitic pamphlets and newspapers such as the Völkischer Beobachter and Der Stürmer Additionally, blame was laid on Jews for having caused Germany's defeat in World War I (see Dolchstosslegende).

The Nazi antisemitic program quickly expanded beyond mere speech. Starting in 1933, repressive laws were passed against Jews, culminating in the 1935 Nuremberg Laws which removed most of the rights of citizenship from Jews, using a racial definition that was based on descent, rather than a definition which was based on religion. Sporadic violence against Jews became widespread during the Kristallnacht riots in 1938, which targeted Jewish homes, businesses, and places of worship, killing 91 across Germany and Austria.

With the Nazi invasion of Poland in 1939 and the beginning of World War II, the Nazis began the extermination of Jews in Europe. The Jews were concentrated in ghettos and later were sent to concentration and death camps where they were immediately or eventually murdered. In the occupied territories of the USSR, Jews were murdered by death squads, sometimes with the help of locally recruited units. This practice was later replaced by gassing the Jews in the death camps; the largest of these was Auschwitz.

== Aftermath of the Holocaust ==
After World War II ended in 1945, some surviving Jews began to return to their homes, but many others decided to emigrate to the United States, the United Kingdom, and British-controlled Mandatory Palestine. To some extent, the antisemitism of the Nazi regime continued in different guises. Claims of blood libel and persecution of Jews continued, in part due to fear that returning Jews would attempt to reclaim property stolen during the Holocaust or expose assistance given by elements of the local population in previously Nazi-occupied territories. An example was the Kielce pogrom, which occurred in 1946 in Poland when citizens violently attacked Jews based on a false accusation of the kidnapping of a Christian child.

The postwar period also witnessed a rise in antisemitic persecution in the USSR. In 1948, Stalin launched the campaign against the "rootless cosmopolitan" in which numerous Yiddish-language poets, writers, painters, and sculptors were killed or arrested. This culminated in the Doctors' Plot, issued between 1952 and 1953, during which a number of Jewish doctors were arrested and accused of attempting to murder leading party leaders. Modern historian Edvard Radzinsky has also suggested that Stalin planned to deport the Jewish population of the USSR to exile in Kazakhstan, Siberia or the Jewish Autonomous Oblast.

== Contemporary era ==
Antisemitic incidents have increased significantly in Europe since 2000. Those incidents took place not only in France and Germany, but also in Belgium, Austria, and the United Kingdom. Physical assaults against Jews including beatings, stabbings, and other violence, increased markedly, in a number of cases resulting in serious injury and even death. Moreover, the Netherlands and Sweden have also had consistently high rates of antisemitic attacks. There was a spike in incidents across Europe during the 2014 Gaza war. Reflecting on this, a 2015 report on religious freedom by the US State Department declared that "European anti-Israel sentiment crossed the line into anti-Semitism."

This rise in antisemitic attacks is associated with Islamist antisemitism along with the rise of far-right political parties owing to the 2008 financial crisis. There are a number of antisemitic political parties in the EU, and a survey in ten European countries revealed high levels of antisemitic attitudes. Greece's neo-Nazi party, Golden Dawn, won 21 seats in parliament, although these had all been lost by 2019.

In Eastern Europe, antisemitism in the 21st century continued on a similar scale to the 1990s. The dissolution of the Soviet Union and the instability of the new states has brought the rise of nationalist movements and accusations against Jews of responsibility for the economic crisis, controlling local businesses and bribing the government, alongside traditional and religious motives for antisemitism (blood libels for example). Nevertheless, there were several violent attacks against Jews in Moscow, in 1999 a failed bomb attack occurred at the Bolshaya Bronnaya Synagogue, in 2006 when a neo-Nazi stabbed nine people, the threats against Jewish pilgrims in Uman, Ukraine and the attack against a menorah by extremist Christian organization in Moldova in 2009. In 2008, the radical Svoboda (Freedom) party of Ukraine captured more than 10% of the popular vote, giving electoral support to a party well known for its antisemitic rhetoric. They joined the ranks of Jobbik, an openly antisemitic party, in the Hungarian parliament.

According to a 2024 report by the European Union Agency for Fundamental Rights, in the year after the October 7 attacks, there was a 400% increase in antisemitic activities across Europe. 96% of the European Jews it surveyed said they had encountered antisemitism in their everyday lives. In September 2024, Katharina von Schnurbein, the European Commission's coordinator on combating antisemitism and fostering Jewish life in Europe, stated at a United Nations workshop that the current rise of antisemitic events "reminds us of the darkest days of Europe".

A 2026 study by UNESCO across 23 EU states found that 61% of surveyed school teachers reported witnessing Holocaust denial among students and 42% reported observing antisemitism among colleagues. Almost 50% had observed Nazi gestures and symbols from students.

=== Public opinion polls ===
The summary of a 2004 poll by the "Pew Global Attitudes Project" noted, "Despite concerns about rising antisemitism in Europe, there are no indications that anti-Jewish sentiment has increased over the past decade. Favorable ratings of Jews are actually higher now in France, Germany, and Russia than they were in 1991. Nonetheless, Jews are better liked in the US than in Germany and Russia." According to 2005 survey results by the Anti-Defamation League, antisemitic attitudes remain common in Europe. Over 30% of those surveyed believed that Jews have too much power in business, with responses ranging from lows of 11% in Denmark and 14% in England to highs of 66% in Hungary, and over 40% in Poland and Spain. The results of religious antisemitism also persist and over 20% of European respondents agreed that Jews were responsible for the death of Jesus, with France having the lowest percentage at 13% and Poland having the highest number of those agreeing, at 39%.

A 2006 study in the Journal of Conflict Resolution found that although almost no respondents in countries of the European Union regarded themselves as antisemitic, antisemitic attitudes correlated with anti-Israel opinions. Observing populations in 10 European countries, Charles A. Small and Edward H. Kaplan surveyed 5,000 respondents, asking them about Israeli actions and classical antisemitic stereotypes. The surveys asked questions about whether people thought that the IDF purposely targets children or poisons the Palestinian water supplies. The study found that "people who believed the anti-Israel mythologies also tended to believe that Jews are not honest in business, have dual loyalties, control government and the economy, and the like." The study found anti-Israel respondents were 56% more likely to be antisemitic than the average European.

According to a poll conducted by the Anti-Defamation League (ADL) in 2012, antisemitic attitudes in ten European countries remain at "disturbingly high levels", peaking in Eastern Europe and Spain, with large swaths of the population subscribing to classical antisemitic notions such as Jews having too much power in business, being more loyal to Israel than their own country, or "talking too much" about the Holocaust. In comparison with a similar poll conducted in 2009, several of the countries showed high levels in the overall level of antisemitism, while other countries experienced more modest increases:

- Austria: Experienced a slight decrease to 28 percent from 30 percent in 2009.
- France: The overall level of antisemitism increased to 24 percent of the population, up from 20 percent in 2009.
- Germany: antisemitism increased by one percentage point, to 21 percent of the population.
- Hungary: The level rose to 63 percent of the population, compared with 47 percent in 2009.
- Poland: The number remained unchanged, with 48 percent of the population showing deep-seated antisemitic attitudes.
- Spain: Fifty-three percent (53%) percent of the population, compared to 48 percent in 2009.
- United Kingdom: antisemitic attitudes jumped to 17 percent of the population, compared to 10 percent in 2009.

In January 2019 the European Commission published a survey of 28 countries which showed a wide gap in perceptions between Jews and non-Jews in Europe. 89% of the Jews surveyed thought that antisemitism had "significantly increased" over the last five years, whereas only 36% of non-Jews believed the same.

A CNN-sponsored poll in 2018 established that antisemitic stereotypes were very prevalent in Europe. One fifth of the people surveyed declared that Jews have too much influence in media and politics, and one third stated they knew little or nothing about the Holocaust. In 2023, 52% of 8,000 Jews from 13 European countries surveyed said they have experienced antisemitism in public in the year before the survey, 90% responded they had encountered antisemitism online in the past year. Overall, Jews in Europe are pessimistic about antisemitism and expect it to get worse, but most have no intentions to leave Europe.

=== Eastern and Central Europe ===
Polling data taken in 2015-2016 shows the following results regarding the proportions of Christians in the following countries who would reject Jews as family members, neighbors or citizens.

Rejection of Jews among Christians in specific social relations in Eastern Europe (source: Pew 2017, data from 2015 to 2016)
Country	% Reject Jews as family members (at 95% confidence level)		% Reject Jews as neighbors (at 95% confidence level)		% Reject Jews as national citizens (at 95% confidence level)
Armenia	66		33		33
Belarus overall	-	-	-	-	13
Belarus, Orthodox Christians	32		17		11
Belarus, Catholic	37		16		16
Bosnia overall	-	-	-	-	8
Bosnia, Orthodox	39		9		6
Bosnia, Catholic	39		12		9
Bulgaria	31		9		7
Croatia	26		12		9
Czech Republic (Catholics only)	35		18		15
Estonia, overall	-	-	-	-	10
Estonia, Orthodox	25		10		5
Georgia	62		18		12
Greece	52		22		17
Hungary	24		15		14
Latvia overall	-	-	-	-	9
Latvia, Orthodox	25		9		8
Latvia, Catholic	29		11		8
Lithuania	50		24		23
Moldova	49		21		13
Poland	31		21		19
Romania	54		30		23
Russia	37		19		13
Serbia	30		10		8
Ukraine	29		13		5

=== Muslim Europeans ===
According to Manfred Gerstenfeld, a 2005 French study showed that anti-Jewish prejudice was more prevalent among religious Muslims than among non-religious ones; 46% expressed antisemitic sentiments compared to 30% of non-practising Muslims in France. Only 28% of the religious Muslims were found to be totally without such prejudice. According to Gerstenfeld, the few studies available which had been conducted among Muslim youth in various western European countries showed some similar outcomes. Gerstenfeld cited a 2011 study of elementary school children in Dutch-language schools in Brussels by a Belgian sociologist that found that about 50 percent of Muslim students in second and third grade in these schools could be considered antisemites, compared to 10% of others. Also in 2011, Gunther Jikeli published findings from 117 interviews with 19-year-old Muslim youths in Berlin, Paris, and London, the majority of whom voiced antisemitic feelings. Participants in the antisemitic riots outside the Israeli embassy in 2009 were said to be mainly Muslim youth, supported by left-wing autonomous Blitz activists.

Islamist militants have been involved in several violent attacks on Jews. In 2012, in Toulouse, armed militant Mohammed Merah, the child of Muslim parents from Algeria, murdered four Jews. Merah had previously targeted French army soldiers. A brother of the shooter, Abdelghani Merah, said he and his siblings had been brought up on antisemitic views espoused by their parents.

== By country ==
=== Andorra ===
The Jewish community in Andorra is very small and, according to a 2024 Times of Israel article, has historically lived with relatively low levels of antisemitism, with virtually no reported antisemitic hostility or anti-Israel protests. Yet, in February 2026, during the annual Carnestoltes carnival, an effigy painted with the colours of the Israeli flag and a Star of David was publicly put on a mock trial, hanged, shot, and burned as part of the festivities, drawing sharp criticism from members of the Jewish community.

=== Armenia ===
A major source of antisemitism in Armenia is Israel's strong relations with and arms sales to Azerbaijan. During the Second Nagorno-Karabakh War, Artsakh (Nagorno-Karabakh) president Arayik Harutyunyan accused Israel of complicity in a 'genocide' against Armenians. Armenians in Lebanon burned the Israeli flag, along with the Turkish and Azerbaijani flags at a protest during that war. In April 1998, Igor Muradyan, a famous Armenian political analyst and economist, published an antisemitic article in one of Armenia's leading newspapers Voice of Armenia. Muradyan claimed that the history of Armenian-Jewish relations has been filled with "Aryans vs. Semites" conflict manifestations. He accused Jews of inciting ethnic conflicts, including the dispute over Nagorno-Karabakh and demonstrated concern for Armenia's safety in light of Israel's good relations with Turkey.

In 2002, a book entitled National System (written by Romen Yepiskoposyan in Armenian and Russian) was printed and presented at the Union of Writers of Armenia. In that book, Jews (along with Turks) are identified as number-one enemies of Armenians and are described as "the nation-destroyer with a mission of destruction and decomposition." A section in the book entitled The Greatest Falsification of the 20th Century denies the Holocaust, claiming that it is a myth created by Zionists to discredit "Aryans": "The greatest falsification in human history is the myth of Holocaust.... no one was killed in gas chambers. There were no gas chambers." Similar accusations were voiced by Armen Avetissian, the leader of the small ultra-nationalist party, Armenian Aryan Order (AAO), on 11 February 2002, when he also called for the Israeli ambassador Rivka Kohen to be declared persona non-grata in Armenia for Israel's refusal to give the Armenian massacres of 1915 equal status with the Holocaust. In addition, he asserted that the number of victims of the Holocaust has been overstated.

In 2004, Armen Avetissian expressed extremist remarks against Jews in several issues of the AAO run The Armeno-Aryan newspaper, as well as during a number of meetings and press conferences, leading to his party's exclusion from the Armenian Nationalist Front. He was arrested in January 2005 on charges of inciting ethnic hatred. Shortly after, during a prime time talk show, the leader of the People's Party and the owner of ALM television channel, Tigran Karapetyan, accused Jews of assisting Ottoman authorities in the 1915 Armenian Genocide. His interviewee, Armen Avetissian stated that "the Armenian Aryans intend to fight against the Jewish-Masonic aggression and will do what it takes to repress evil in its own nest." Speaking about Armenia's Jewish community Avetissian said that it consists of "700 of those who identify themselves as Jews and 50,000 of those whom the Aryans will soon reveal while cleansing the country of Jewish evil." The Jewish Council of Armenia addressed its concerns to the government and various human rights organizations demanding to stop promoting ethnic hatred and to ban ALM. However, these demands were mostly disregarded.

On 23 October 2004, the head of the Department for Ethnic and Religious Minority Issues, Hranoush Kharatyan, publicly commented on so-called "Judaist" xenophobia in Armenia. She said: "Why are we not responding to the fact that on their Friday gatherings, Judaists continue to advocate hatred towards all non-Judaists as far as comparing the latter to cattle and propagating spitting on them?" Kharatyan also accused local Jews of calling for "anti-Christian actions." The Jewish Council of Armenia sent an open letter to President Robert Kocharian expressing its deep concern with the recent rise of antisemitism. Armen Avetissian responded to this by publishing yet another antisemitic article in the Iravunq newspaper, where he stated: "Any country that has a Jewish minority is under big threat in terms of stability." Later while meeting with the Chairman of the National Assembly of Armenia Artur Baghdasarian, head of the Jewish Council of Armenia Rima Varzhapetian insisted that the government took steps to prevent further acts of antisemitism. Avetissian was arrested on 24 January 2005. Several prominent academic figures, such as Levon Ananyan (the head of the Writers union of Armenia) and composer Ruben Hakhverdian supported Avetissian and called upon the authorities to release him. In their demands to release him they were joined by opposition deputies and ombudsman Larisa Alaverdyan as the authorities had arrested him for political speech.

In September 2006, while criticizing the American Global Gold corporation, Armenian Minister of Environment Vardan Ayvazyan said during a press conference: "Do you know who you are defending? You are defending kikes! Go over their [company headquarters] and find out who is behind this company and if we should let them come here!" After Rimma Varzhapetian's protests, Aivazian claimed he did not mean to offend Jews, and that such criticism was intended strictly for the Global Gold company. On 23 December 2007, The Jewish Holocaust Memorial in central Yerevan was vandalized by unknown individuals. A Nazi swastika symbol was scratched and black paint was splattered on the simple stone. After notifying the local police, Rabbi Gershon Burshtein, a Chabad emissary who serves as Chief Rabbi of the country's tiny Jewish community said "I just visited the memorial the other day and everything was fine. This is terrible, as there are excellent relations between Jews and Armenians." The monument has been defaced and toppled several times in the past. It is located in the city's Aragast Park, a few blocks north of the centrally located Republic Square, which is home to a number of government buildings.

On 12 February 2021, the Holocaust Memorial in Yerevan was once again vandalized. On 15 November 2023, a month into the Gaza war, the Mordechai Navi Synagogue was set ablaze.

=== Austria ===
Home movie from Vienna taken just after Kristallnacht in 1938

Antisemitism has a long history in Austria, typically focused on the large presence of Jews in Vienna. The Jews were systematically destroyed 1938–1945. Evidences of the presence of Jewish communities in the geographical area today covered by Austria can be traced back to the 12th century. In 1848 Jews were granted civil rights and the right to establish an autonomous religious community, but full citizenship rights were given only in 1867. In an atmosphere of economic, religious, and social freedom, the Jewish population grew from 6,000 in 1860 to almost 185,000 in 1938. In March 1938, Austria was annexed by Nazi Germany and thousands of Austrian Jews were sent to concentration camps. Of the 65,000 Viennese Jews deported to concentration camps, only about 2,000 survived, while around 800 survived World War II in hiding. In the Habsburg Empire, the antisemitic movement was strongly concentrated on Vienna.

Antisemitism did not cease to exist in the aftermath of World War II and continued to be part of Austrian political life and culture with its strongest hold in the political parties and the media. Bernd Marin, an Austrian sociologist, has characterized antisemitism in Austria after 1945 as an 'antisemitism without Jews', since Jews constituted only 0.1 percent of the Austrian population. Antisemitism was stronger in those areas where Jews no longer lived and where previously practically no Jews had lived, and among people who neither have had nor have any personal contact with Jews. Since post-war prejudice against Jews has been publicly forbidden and tabooed, antisemitism was actually 'antisemitism without antisemites', but different expressions of it were to be found in the Austrian polities. During the 1980s, the taboo against open expressions of explicitly antisemitic beliefs has remained, but the means of circumventing it linguistically have extended its boundaries in such a way that the taboo itself appears to have lost some of its significance. Anti-Jewish prejudices which had remained hidden began to surface and were increasingly found in public settings. Thus, verbal antisemitism was rarely expressed directly, but rather used coded expressions, which reflected one of the country's major characteristics – ambivalence and ambiguity toward its past.

Today the Jewish community of Austria consists of about 8,000 persons. Contemporary antisemitism was reported from Serfaus during 2009 and 2010. Several hotels and apartments in the holiday resort have confirmed a policy of not allowing Jews on their premises. Bookings are tried to be detected in advance based on racial profiling, and are denied to possible orthodox Jews. Some are concerned about a potential rise in antisemitism following the victory of the far right Freedom Party – founded by Nazis – in the September 2024 elections. Two days before the elections, the party caused controversy when party officials sung and SS song at the funeral of former member.

=== Belgium ===
Over a hundred antisemitic attacks were recorded in Belgium in 2009, a 100% increase from the year before. The perpetrators were usually young males of immigrant Muslim backgrounds from the Middle East. In 2009, the Belgian city of Antwerp, often referred to as Europe's last shtetl, experienced a surge in antisemitic violence. Bloeme Evers-Emden, an Amsterdam resident and Auschwitz survivor, was quoted in the newspaper Aftenposten in 2010: "The antisemitism now is even worse than before the Holocaust. The antisemitism has become more violent. Now they are threatening to kill us."

The behavior prompted by the 2012 local elections in the municipality of Schaarbeek impelled the president of the Coordination Committee of Jewish Organizations in Belgium, Maurice Sosnowski, to observe that "candidates who belonged to the Jewish community were attacked for their affiliation" and the municipality saw a "hate campaign under the pretext of anti-Zionism." Several other incidents occurred in 2012- in November, demonstrators at an anti-Israel rally in Antwerp rally chanted "Hamas, Hamas, all Jews to the gas." In October, a synagogue in Brussels was vandalized by two unidentified male perpetrators who spray-painted "death to the Jews" and "boom" on the wall.

The increased frequency of antisemitic attacks started in May 2014, when four people were killed in a shooting at the Belgian Jewish Museum in Brussels. Two days later, a young Muslim man entered the CCU (Jewish Cultural Center) while an event was taking place and shouted racist slurs. A month later, a school bus in Antwerp, that was driving five-year-old Jewish children was stoned by a group of Muslim teens. Towards the end of August 2014, a 75-year-old Jewish woman was hit and pushed to the ground because of her Jewish-sounding surname.

In 2020 Israel asked that the Carnaval parade in Aalst be canceled because of antisemitism. UNIA, Belgium's federal equality agency, reported a 1,000% increase in antisemitic incidents in the two months following the outbreak of the Gaza War, compared with similar periods in previous years. In the wake of these staggering statistics, the International Movement for Peace and Coexistence (IMPAC) raised concerns about issues of bias regarding how the Palestinian-Israel conflict is presented in Belgian schools.

=== Bulgaria ===
Antisemitism became a political force in Bulgaria in the late 19th century. In World War II the community of about 50,000 was largely protected when King Boris III refused to hand over the Jews to the Nazis after the war most went to Israel.

There are about 2,000 Jews still living in Bulgaria today. In early 2019, an incident occurred in Bulgaria where rocks were thrown at a synagogue in Sofia, Bulgaria's capital city. Though no one was hurt, the incident occurred only a short time after antisemitic graffiti was found on a monument for victims of Bulgaria's communist regime, which ruled Bulgaria from 1945 to 1989.

=== Czech Republic ===
The Czech lands are known for having less antisemitism than surrounding countries are, despite occasional flare-ups of it such as the 1899 Hilsner Affair. In the late 19th century Czech nationalists were sharply critical of conservative Jews who supported the German government based in Vienna, and also the radical Jews who organized a socialist party in Prague. After 1919 Tomáš Garrigue Masaryk, the first president of Czechoslovakia, strongly opposed antisemitism. He left office in 1935 and subsequently there was increasing hostility.

In 2019, Associated Press reported that antisemitism was on the rise, especially from far-right, pro-Russian elements: two physical attacks and three instances of vandalism were reported. The 2024 annual report of the Federation of Jewish Communities in the Czech Republic (FJC) reports a 90% increase of antisemitic incidents in 2023 from the year prior.

=== Denmark ===
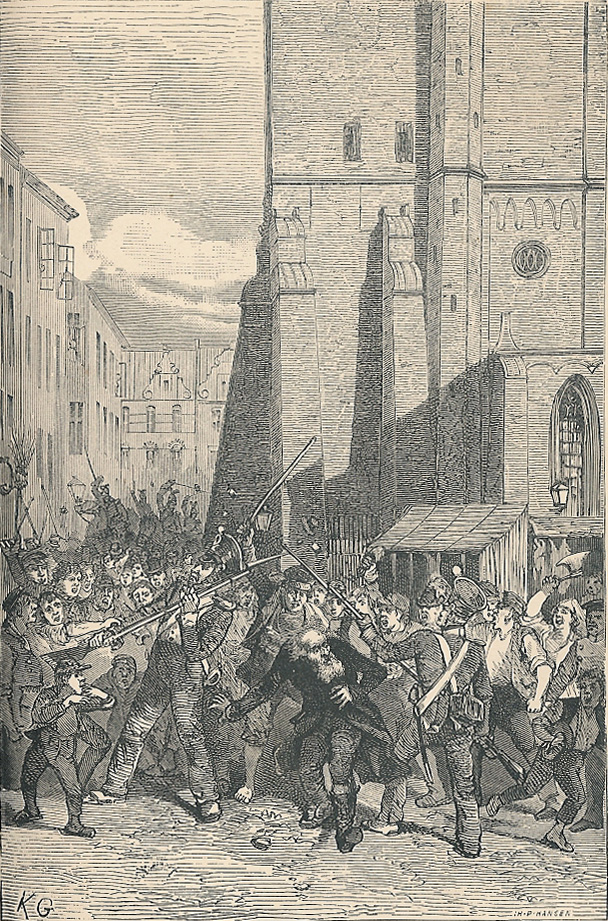
1819 anti-Jewish riots in Copenhagen

Antisemitism in Denmark has not been as widespread as in other countries. Initially, Jews were banned as in other countries in Europe, but beginning in the 17th century, Jews were allowed to live in Denmark freely, unlike in other European countries where they were forced to live in ghettos.

In 1819 a series of anti-Jewish riots in Germany spread to several neighboring countries including Denmark, resulting in mob attacks on Jews in Copenhagen and many provincial towns. These riots were known as Hep! Hep! Riots, from the derogatory rallying cry against the Jews in Germany. Riots lasted for five months during which time shop windows were smashed, stores looted, homes attacked, and Jews physically abused. 2011 to 2013 averaged around 43 antisemitic incidents a year. In July 2014, during the Gaza War, there was an increase in antisemitic rhetoric as death threats were expressed against Jews in Denmark. In August 2014, the Carolineskolen, a Jewish school, kindergarten, and daycare complex in Copenhagen was vandalized, some windows were smashed and graffiti was sprayed on the school walls which referred to the ongoing conflict between the Israeli military and the militant group Hamas. In February 2015, a Jewish man was killed and two police officers were injured during a shooting outside the main synagogue of Copenhagen.

In 2017 an imam in Copenhagen called during Friday prayers for the slaughter of all Jews, citing a hadith. The Middle East Media Research Institute translated parts of his speech, warning the Jewish community in Denmark, who reported the imam to Danish police officials. Recent efforts to outlaw infant circumcision for non-medical reasons have been characterized as motivated by xenophobia in general or antisemitism in particular. Jonatan Cohn, leader of AKVAH (Department of Mapping and Knowledge-sharing of Antisemitic Events, a department of Jødisk Samfund), describes the proposal as the main thing that "destroys the night sleep of Jewish Danes", more so than antisemitism among "young Muslim men", and goes on to say that

Apart from the troubling aspect of the many half-truths, the misinformation and the often rather hostile tone that characterizes the circumcision debate, it raises a series of unpleasant questions for many Danish Jews: If a criminalization of so central a part of Jewish religion and culture were to actually be passed, for how long can one then continue one's existence in Denmark? (...) Arabic bullies have so far not managed to create among the Danish Jews so lasting and general an uneasiness that one might need to leave one's fatherland because one intends to continue to practise one's religion. This dubious honour belongs solely to Jyllandsposten and its friends in the circumcision debate.

— Jonatan Cohn

Iman Diab and Güray Baba, members of Intact Denmark with a self-described "minority background", report being accused of being "antisemites, traitors, persecutors of minority parents" due to their involvement in the circumcision debate. In February 2024, The Associated Press reported that the number of antisemitic incidents in Denmark "reached levels not seen since World War II," according to Henri Goldstein, the leader of the country's Jewish community; Goldstein cited the Gaza War as the cause of this growing antisemitism.

In 2025, 199 antisemitic incidents were reported in Denmark according to a report published by the Danish Jewish Community's Department for Mapping and Registering Antisemitic Incidents in the beginning of May 2026. 24 of these incidents were against Jewish children and young people. The total is the second-highest figure since monitoring started in 2012. According to Rosen, chairperson of the Jewish Community, "Unfortunately, antisemitism in Denmark is not retreating. It has become normalised at an unprecedented level."

=== France ===
Despite the fact that a large majority of French people have favorable attitudes towards Jews, acts of anti-Jewish violence, property destruction, and racist language are a serious cause for concern.

With the start of the Second Intifada, antisemitic incidents increased in France. In 2002, the Commission nationale consultative des droits de l'homme (Human Rights Commission) reported six times more antisemitic incidents than in 2001 (193 incidents in 2002). The commission's statistics showed that antisemitic acts constituted 62% of all racist acts in the country (compared to 45% in 2001 and 80% in 2000. The report documented 313 violent acts against people or property, including 38 injuries and the murder of someone with Maghrebin origins by far-right skinheads.

According to the National Advisory Committee on Human Rights, antisemitic acts account for a majority— 72% in all in 2003— of racist acts in France. 40% of racist violence perpetrated in France in 2013 targeted the Jewish minority, despite the fact that Jews represent less than 1% of the French population.

According to a 2006 poll by the Pew Global Attitudes Project, 71% of French Muslims have positive views of Jews, the highest percentage in the world.

About 7,000 French Jews moved to Israel in 2014. This was 1% of the entire French Jewish population and a record number since World War II. Conversations within the European Jewish community indicate that antisemitic attacks in France are the impetus for the high emigration figures. French Prime Minister Manuel Valls expressed his concern about the trend: "If 100,000 French people of Spanish origin were to leave, I would never say that France is not France anymore. But if 100,000 Jews leave, France will no longer be France. The French Republic will be judged a failure." The trend of increased emigration continued into 2015 due to a rise in assaults and intimidation by Muslim extremists. Emigration levels declined in each year from 2015 through 2020. However, a 2024 survey showed that 68% of French Jews feel unsafe in light of rising antisemitism, and many are considering emigrating.

=== Germany ===
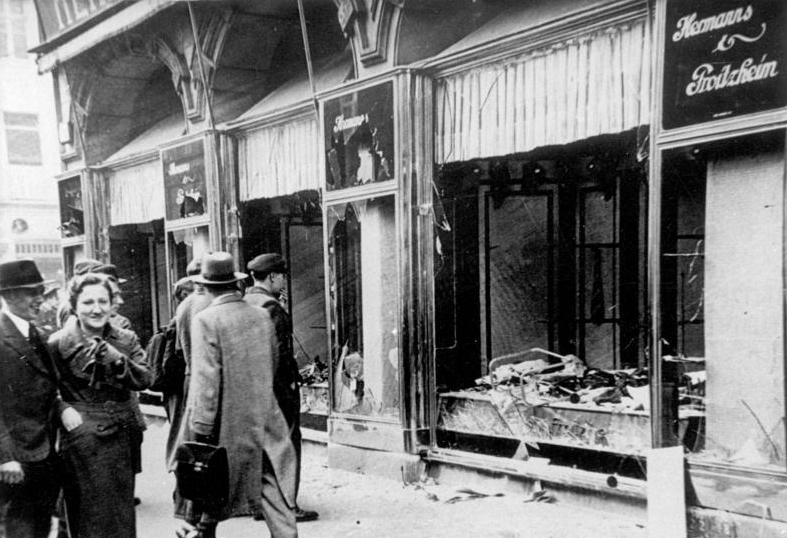
Germans smile while walking past a Jewish shop damaged on Kristallnacht, Magdeburg, 1938.

From the early Middle Ages to the 18th century, Jews in Germany were subjected to many persecutions but they also enjoyed brief periods of tolerance. Though the 19th century began with a series of riots and pogroms against the Jews, emancipation followed in 1848, so that, by the early 20th century, the Jews in Germany were the most integrated Jews in Europe. The situation changed in the early 1930s with the rise of the Nazis and their explicitly antisemitic program. Hate speech which referred to Jewish citizens as "dirty Jews" became common in antisemitic pamphlets and newspapers such as the Völkischer Beobachter and Der Stürmer. Additionally, blame was laid on Jews for having caused Germany's defeat in World War I (see Dolchstosslegende). Anti-Jewish propaganda expanded rapidly. Nazi cartoons that depicted "dirty Jews" frequently portrayed a dirty, physically unattractive, and badly dressed "Talmudic" Jew in traditional religious garments similar to those which are worn by Hasidic Jews. Articles attacking Jews, while concentrating on the commercial and political activities of prominent Jews, also frequently attacked them based on religious dogmas, such as the blood libel.

==== Nazi Germany ====
The Nazi antisemitic program quickly expanded beyond mere speech. Starting in 1933, repressive laws were passed against Jews, culminating in the Nuremberg Laws which removed most of the rights of citizenship from Jews, using a racial definition that was based on descent, rather than a religious definition which determined who was a Jew. Sporadic violence against the Jews became widespread during the Kristallnacht riots, which targeted Jewish homes, businesses and places of worship, killing hundreds across Germany and Austria. The antisemitic agenda culminated in the genocide of the Jews of Europe, known as the Holocaust.

==== Germany 1945–2000 ====
In 1998, Ignatz Bubis said that Jews could not live freely in Germany. In 2002, the historian Julius Schoeps said that "resolutions by the German parliament to reject antisemitism are drivel of the worst kind" and "all those ineffective actions are presented to the world as a strong defense against the charge of antisemitism. The truth is: no one is really interested in these matters. No one really cares."

View chart definition.
Perpetrators of antisemitic verbal harassment and physical assault. Attackers characterised by victim. An attacker may belong to more than 1 group.

==== 21st-century Germany ====
A 2012 poll showed that 18% of the Turks in Germany regard Jews as inferior human beings. A similar study found that most of Germany's native-born Muslim youth and children of immigrants have antisemitic views.

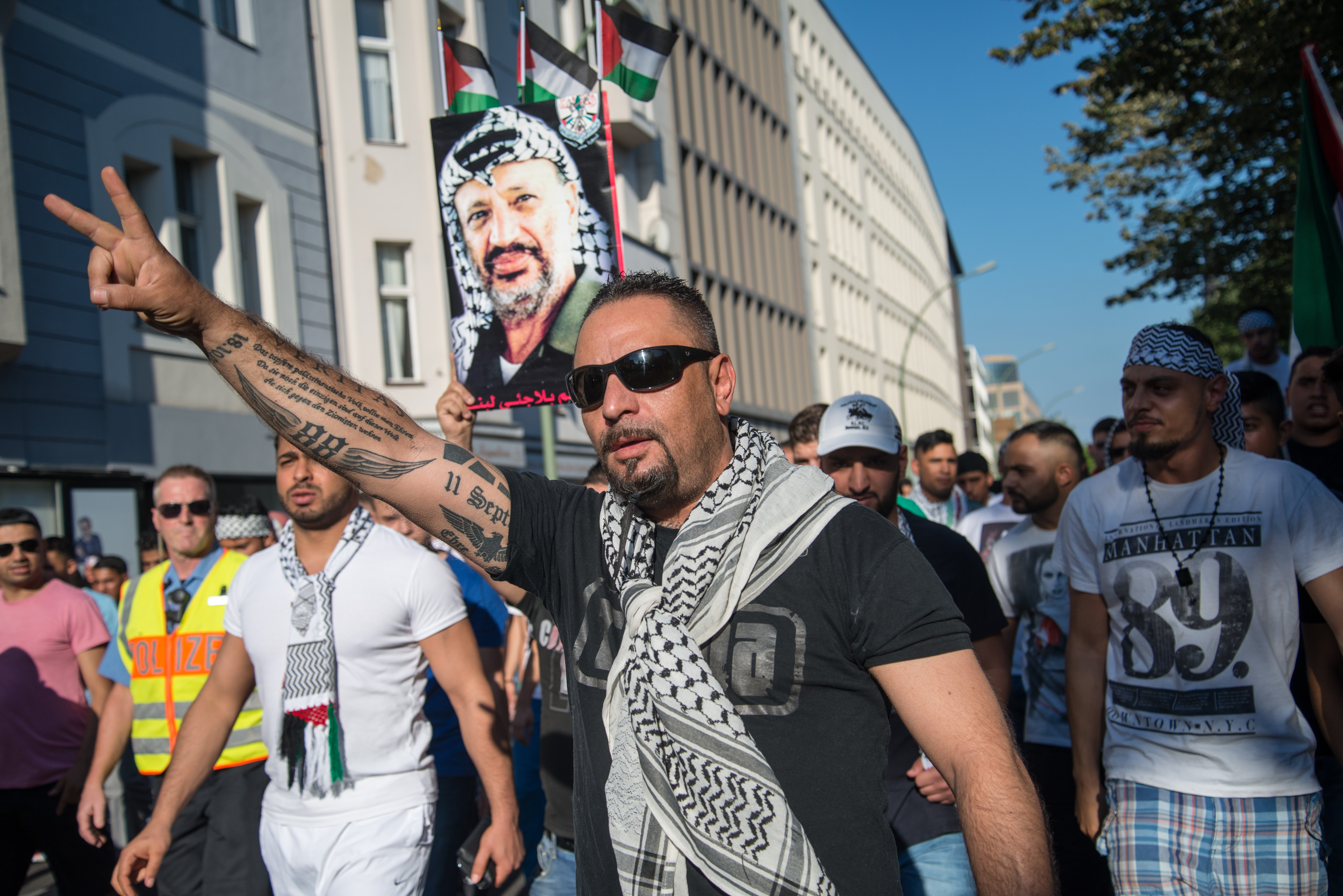
Antisemitic demonstrator in Berlin with Nazi tattoos on arm

A 2017 study on Jewish experiences of antisemitism in Germany by Bielefeld University found that individuals and groups perceived as belonging to the extreme right and extreme left were equally represented as perpetrators of antisemitic harassment experienced in the previous twelve months, such as oblique or overt insults (reported by 62% and 29% of respondents respectively) or physical assaults (reported by 3%), and that a large part of the insults and attacks was attributed to Muslims. The study also found that 70% of the participants feared a rise in antisemitism due to immigration, citing the antisemitic views of refugees. This is despite the fact that there is "no reliable correlations between the refugee influx and the numbers of anti-Semitic attacks".

In February 2019, crime data released by the government for 2018 and published in Der Tagesspiegel showed a yearly increase of 10%, with 1,646 crimes linked to a hatred of Jews in 2018, with the totals not finalised as yet. There was a 60% rise in physical attacks (62 violent incidents, compared to 37 in 2017). As of 2020, antisemitic crimes in Germany reached their highest level since Germany began keeping statistics. Following the outbreak of the Gaza war in October 2023, there has been a reported surge in antisemitism and antisemitic incidents to levels that have not been seen in years. In June 2024, the organization RIAS reported 4,782 antisemitic incidents, an increase of 80% compared to the previous year, with more than 70 percent of the incidents being "Israel related". RIAS employs the IHRA definition of antisemitism, which has been criticized for being too broad in including legitimate criticism of Israel.

=== Greece ===
Antisemitism has remained a significant issue in Greece. The Greek economic crisis was one of the main factors in the rise in the scope of antisemitic incidents and the rise of Greece's neo-Nazi party, Golden Dawn, which won 21 seats in parliament in 2012. A number of events of vandalism have occurred throughout the country – in 2002, 2003, and 2010, the Holocaust memorial in Thessaloniki was vandalized, in 2009 the Jewish cemetery in Ioannina was attacked several times and in the same year, the Jewish cemetery in Athens was also attacked. In 2012 in Rhodes, the city's Holocaust monument, was spray-painted with swastikas.

=== Hungary ===
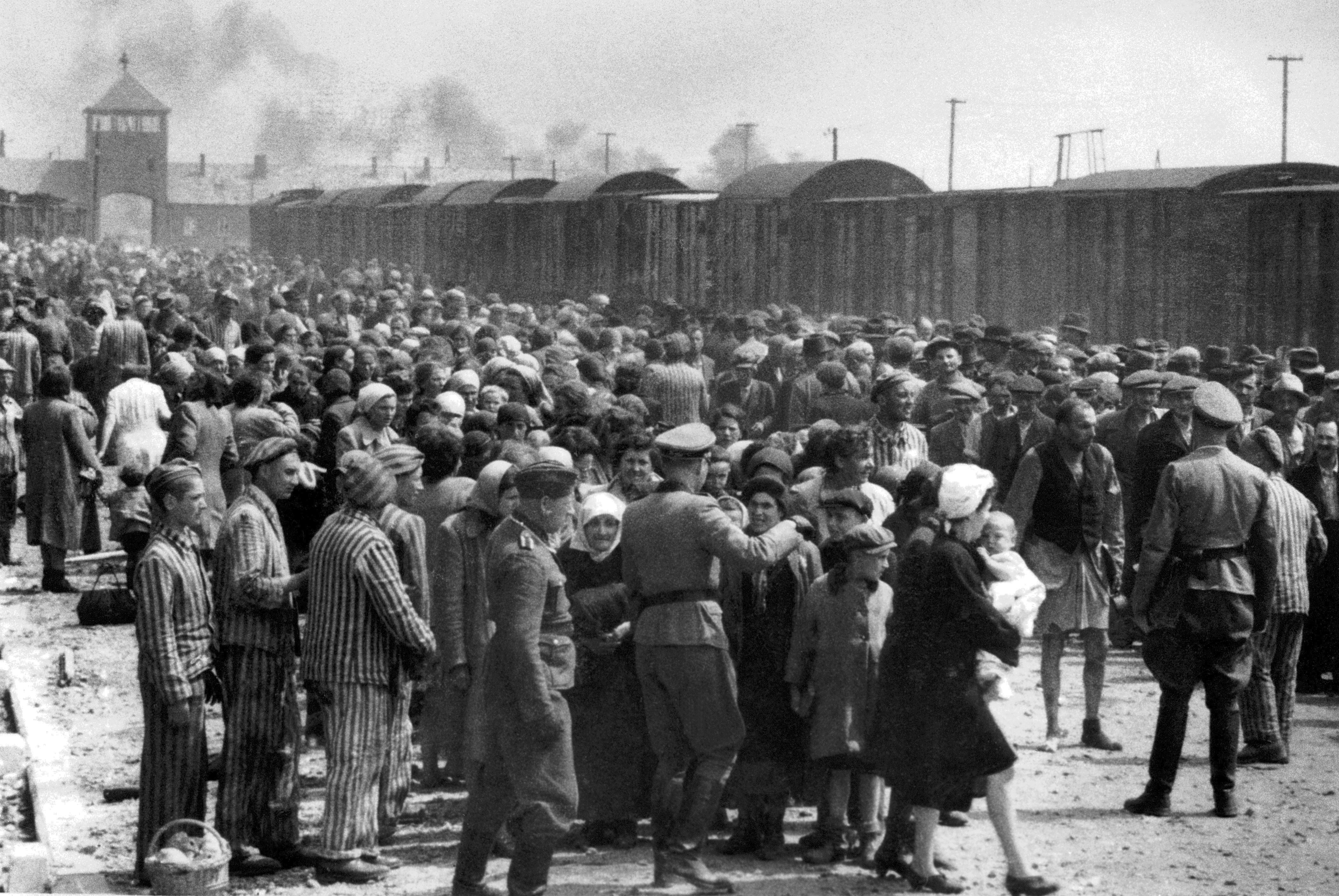
Hungarian Jews on the Judenrampe (Jewish ramp) in Auschwitz II-Birkenau in German-occupied Poland, c. May 1944, after disembarking from the transport trains. To be sent rechts! – to the right – meant labor; links! – to the left – the gas chambers. Photo from the Auschwitz Album (May 1944).

Hungary was the first country after Nazi Germany that passed anti-Jewish laws. In 1939, all the Hungarian Jews were registered. In June 1944, Hungarian police deported nearly 440,000 Jews in more than 145 trains, mostly to Auschwitz.

Antisemitism in Hungary is manifested mainly in far-right publications and demonstrations. Hungarian Justice and Life Party supporters continued their tradition of shouting antisemitic slogans and tearing the US flag to shreds at their annual rallies in Budapest in March 2003 and 2004, commemorating the 1848–1849 revolution. Further, during the demonstrations held to celebrate the anniversary of the 1956 uprising, a post-Communist tradition celebrated by the left and right of the political spectrum, antisemitic and anti-Israel slogans were heard from the right wing, such as accusing Israel of war crimes. The center-right traditionally keeps its distance from the right-wing Csurka-led and other far-right demonstrations.

In 2012, a survey conducted by the Anti-Defamation League found that 63% of the Hungarian population holds antisemitic attitudes.

In 2026, János Bóka acting as Hungary's Special Envoy for Combating Antisemitism, unveiled a government plan to support Jewish life and combat antisemitism, including educational programs, community support, and the establishment of a Holocaust memorial and cultural venue.

=== Ireland ===
A two-year boycott of Limerick's Jewish community was instigated by Catholic priest John Creagh in 1904, who claimed that Jews "came to our land to fasten themselves on us like leeches and to draw our blood". A 2007 survey by The Jewish Chronicle alleged that 20% of Irish people wanted Israelis to be barred from becoming naturalized Irish citizens, while 11% were against the naturalization of Jews. Purported opposition to accepting a Jew into the family was slightly stronger among 18- to 25-year-olds according to the same survey. According to several media reports in 2024, many Irish Jews reported feeling threatened due to their Jewishness, while the President of the World Jewish Congress criticized the Irish school curriculum as "unabashedly antisemitic" in response to a 'Talk about Palestine' initiative to educate students about Palestinian history.

In December 2024, Israeli foreign minister Gideon Sa'ar Israel announced that the Israeli Embassy in Dublin would close due to what he described as the "demonisation of the Jewish state" during the Gaza war by the Irish government. In response, Irish Tánaiste Micheál Martin retorted that the "continuation of the war in Gaza and the loss of innocent lives is simply unacceptable and contravenes international law. It represents the collective punishment of the Palestinian people in Gaza". A January 2026 online survey of 1,000 people by the Claims Conference organization found that 9% of Irish adults believed that the Holocaust was a hoax that never happened in real life, while 19% of those surveyed believed that although Nazi Germany did commit genocide against Jews the official estimates of those killed during The Holocaust had been wildly exaggerated.

=== Italy ===
A 2012 survey by the Anti-Defamation League (ADL), of five European countries in regard to antisemitism included Italy. Of those surveyed:

- 23% of Italians harbor strong antisemitic views
- 58% of Italians believe Italian Jews are more loyal to Israel than Italy.
- 40% believe that Jews have too much power in international financial markets, which is also defined as antisemitism by the European Union.
- 29% say Jews don't care about anyone but their own kind.
- 27% of Italians say that Jews are more willing than others to use shady practices to get what they want.
- 43% believe Jews still talk too much about the Holocaust.

A 2025 poll found that 15% of Italians believe that attacks on Jewish people are 'justifiable', and 18% believe antisemitic graffiti on walls and other public spaces is legitimate.

In 2025, the Antisemitism Observatory of the Centro di Documentazione Ebraica Contemporanea (CDEC) reported 963 classified antisemitic incidents in Italy, based on 1,492 reports received during the year, marking the first time the annual total approached four digits. This followed a similarly high level in 2024, when CDEC recorded 877 antisemitic incidents from 1,384 reports, nearly double the number documented in 2023, indicating a sustained increase in antisemitic activity in Italy over consecutive years.

In the first half of 2026, the CDEC Observatory recorded 401 antisemitic incidents in Italy, 101 of which took place in major cities. Milan recorded the highest number of such incidents (22), followed by Rome (11).

=== Latvia ===
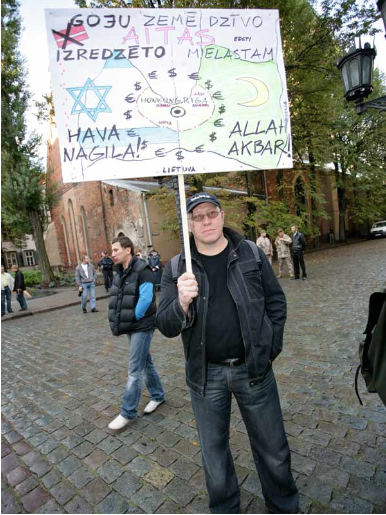
Latvian poster: Goy land sheep for feast of chosen

Two desecrations of Holocaust memorials, in Jelgava and in the Biķernieki Forest, took place in 1993. The delegates of the World Congress of Latvian Jews who came to Biķernieki to commemorate the 46,500 Jews shot there, were shocked by the sight of swastikas and the word Judenfrei daubed on the memorial. Furthermore, Articles of antisemitic content appeared in the Latvian nationalist press. The main topics of these articles were the collaboration of Jews with the Communists in the Soviet period, Jews tarnishing Latvia's good name in the West, and Jewish businessmen striving to control the Latvian economy.

=== Netherlands ===
The Netherlands has the second highest incidence of antisemitic incidents in the European Union. According to Centre for Information and Documentation on Israel (CIDI), a pro-Israel lobby group in the Netherlands, the number of antisemitic incidents reported in the whole of the Netherlands was 108 in 2008, 93 in 2009, and 124 in 2010. Some two-thirds of this are acts of aggression. There are approximately 52 000 Dutch Jews.

According to the NRC Handelsblad newspaper, the number of antisemitic incidents in Amsterdam was 14 in 2008 and 30 in 2009. In 2010, Raphaël Evers, an orthodox rabbi in Amsterdam, told the Norwegian newspaper Aftenposten that Jews can no longer be safe in the city due to the risk of violent assaults. "We Jews no longer feel at home here in the Netherlands. Many people talk about moving to Israel," he said. In 2013, the Dutch Center for Reports on Discrimination (CIDI) noted that there is more antisemitism on the Internet than ever before in its 17-year history.

In March 2026, an explosive device was detonated at the entrance of a synagogue in Rotterdam causing fire. No one was injured. Several suspects were later arrested.

In March and July 2026, Dutch police arrested four suspects from Amsterdam in connection with an explosive or arson alleged plot to attack a synagogue near Adriaan Pauwlaan in Heemstede, near Haarlem. Two of the suspects arrested in March near the synagogue in the area of concealed powerful fireworks, were minors.

=== Norway ===
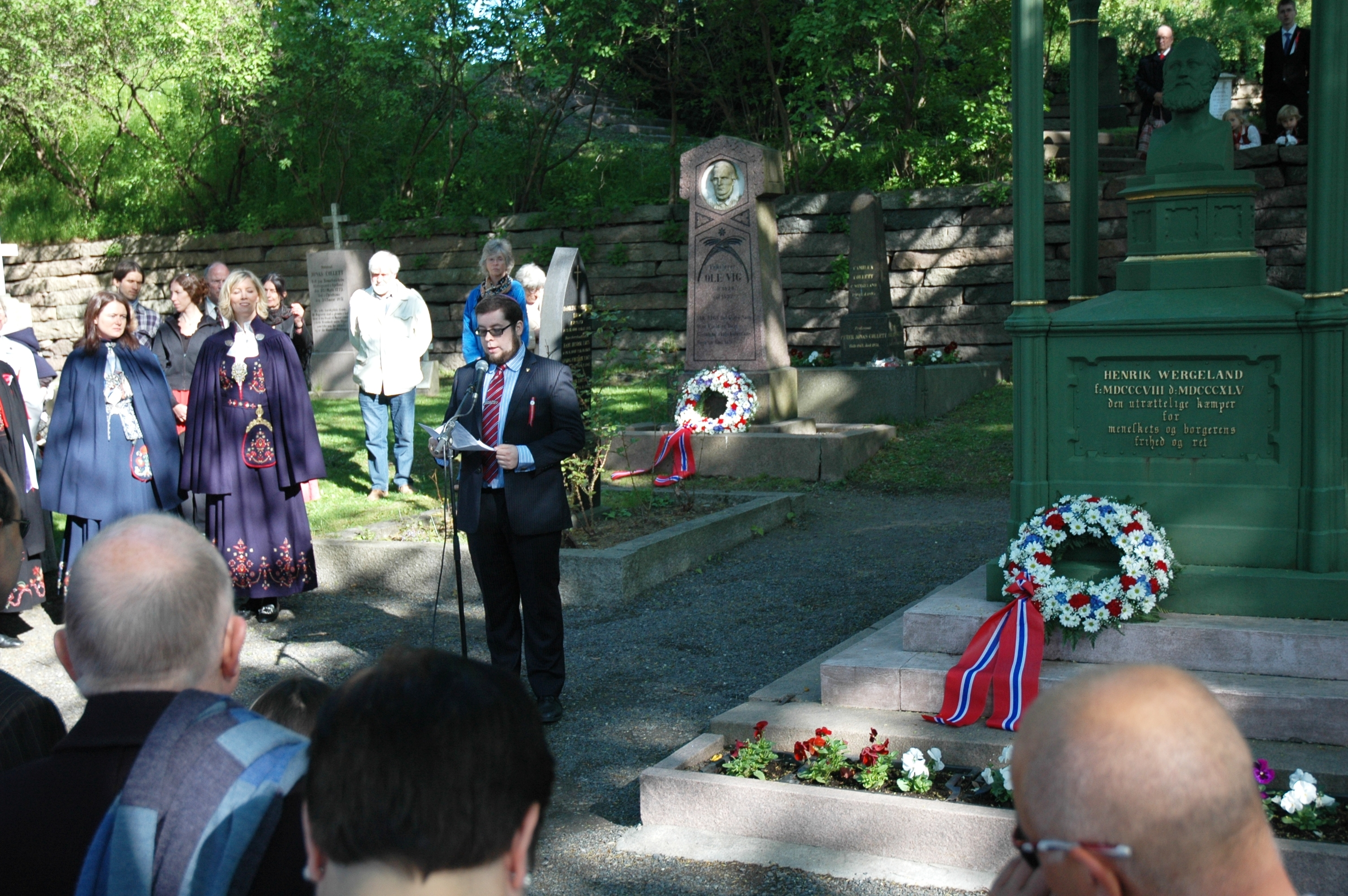
Every year the Jewish community of Norway commemorates Henrik Wergeland who was the driving force behind the repeal of the constitutional ban which prohibited Jews from entering Norway.

Jews were prohibited from living or entering Norway by paragraph 2 (known as the Jew clause in Norway) of the 1814 Constitution, which originally read, "The evangelical-Lutheran religion remains the public religion of the State. Those inhabitants, who confess thereto, are bound to raise their children to the same. Jesuits and monastic orders are not permitted. Jews are still prohibited from entry to the Realm." In 1851 the last sentence was struck out. Monks were permitted in 1897, and Jesuits not before 1956.

The Jew Clause was reinstated 13 March 1942 by Vidkun Quisling during Germany's occupation of Norway, but was reversed when Norway was liberated in May 1945. Before the deportation of Danish Jews, there were 2,173 Jews in Norway, at least 775 of whom were arrested, detained, and/or deported; 765 died as a direct result of the Holocaust. After the war and following a legal purge, Quisling was convicted of high treason (including the unlawful change of the Constitution) and shot by a firing squad.

In 2010, the Norwegian Broadcasting Corporation after one year of research, revealed that antisemitism was common among Norwegian Muslims. Teachers at schools with large shares of Muslims revealed that Muslim students often "praise or admire Adolf Hitler for his killing of Jews", that "Jew-hate is legitimate within vast groups of Muslim students" and that "Muslims laugh or command [teachers] to stop when trying to educate about the Holocaust". Additionally that "while some students might protest when some express support for terrorism, none object when students express hate of Jews" and that it says in "the Quran that you shall kill Jews, all true Muslims hate Jews". Most of these students were said to be born and raised in Norway. One Jewish father also told that his child after school had been taken by a Muslim mob (though managed to escape), reportedly "to be taken out to the forest and hung because he was a Jew".

It was revealed in April 2012 that Johan Galtung, a Norwegian sociologist who pioneered the discipline of peace studies and conflict resolution, made antisemitic comments during public speeches and lectures. Galtung claimed that there was a possible link between the Mossad and Anders Behring Breivik. He also claimed that six Jewish companies control 96% of the media in the United States, a frequent statement made by antisemites. Galtung also claimed that 70% of the professors at the 20 most important American universities are Jewish, and recommended that people read the fraudulent antisemitic manuscript The Protocols of the Elders of Zion.

=== Poland ===
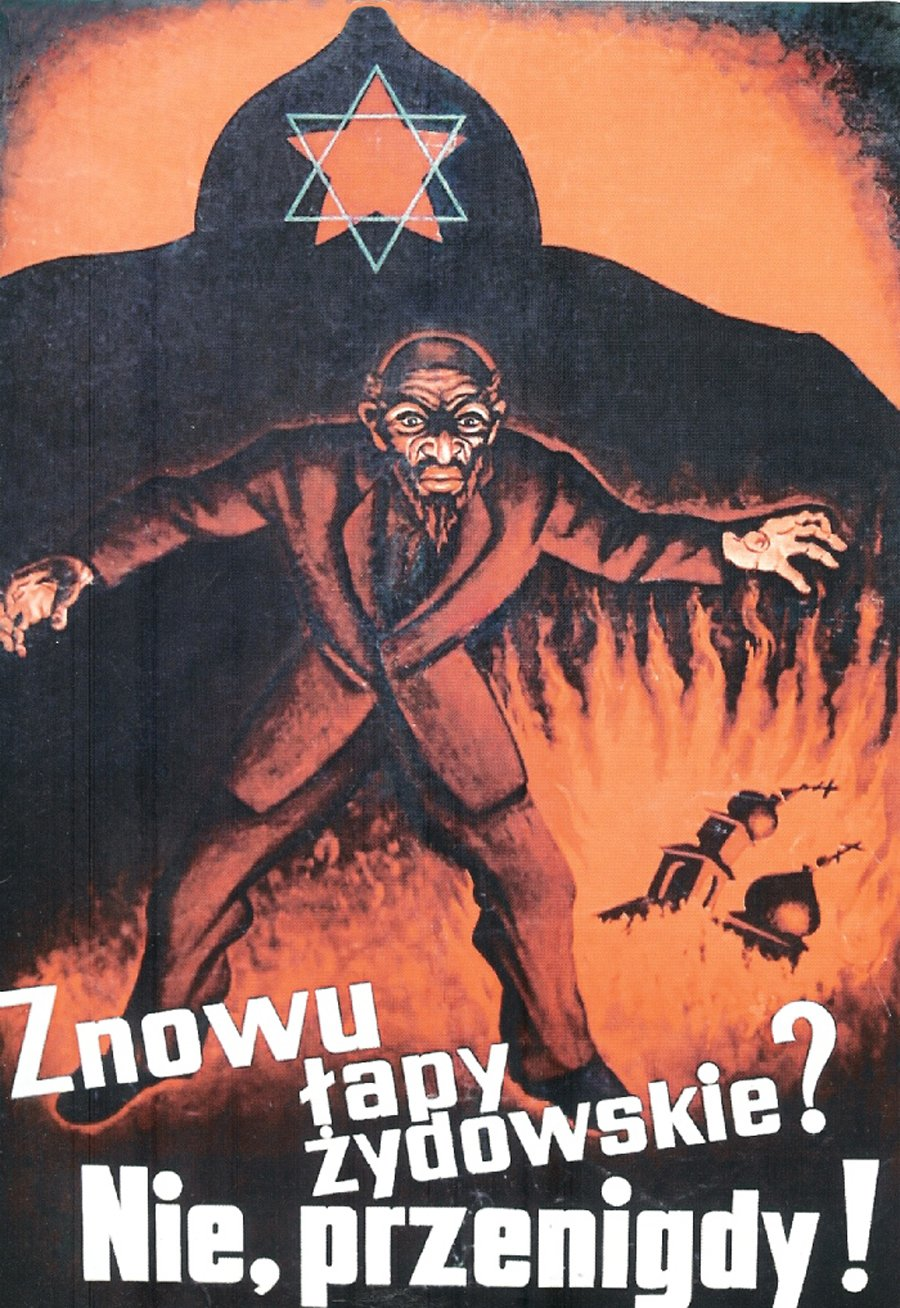
Antisemitic poster dated to the Polish–Soviet War of 1919–1921

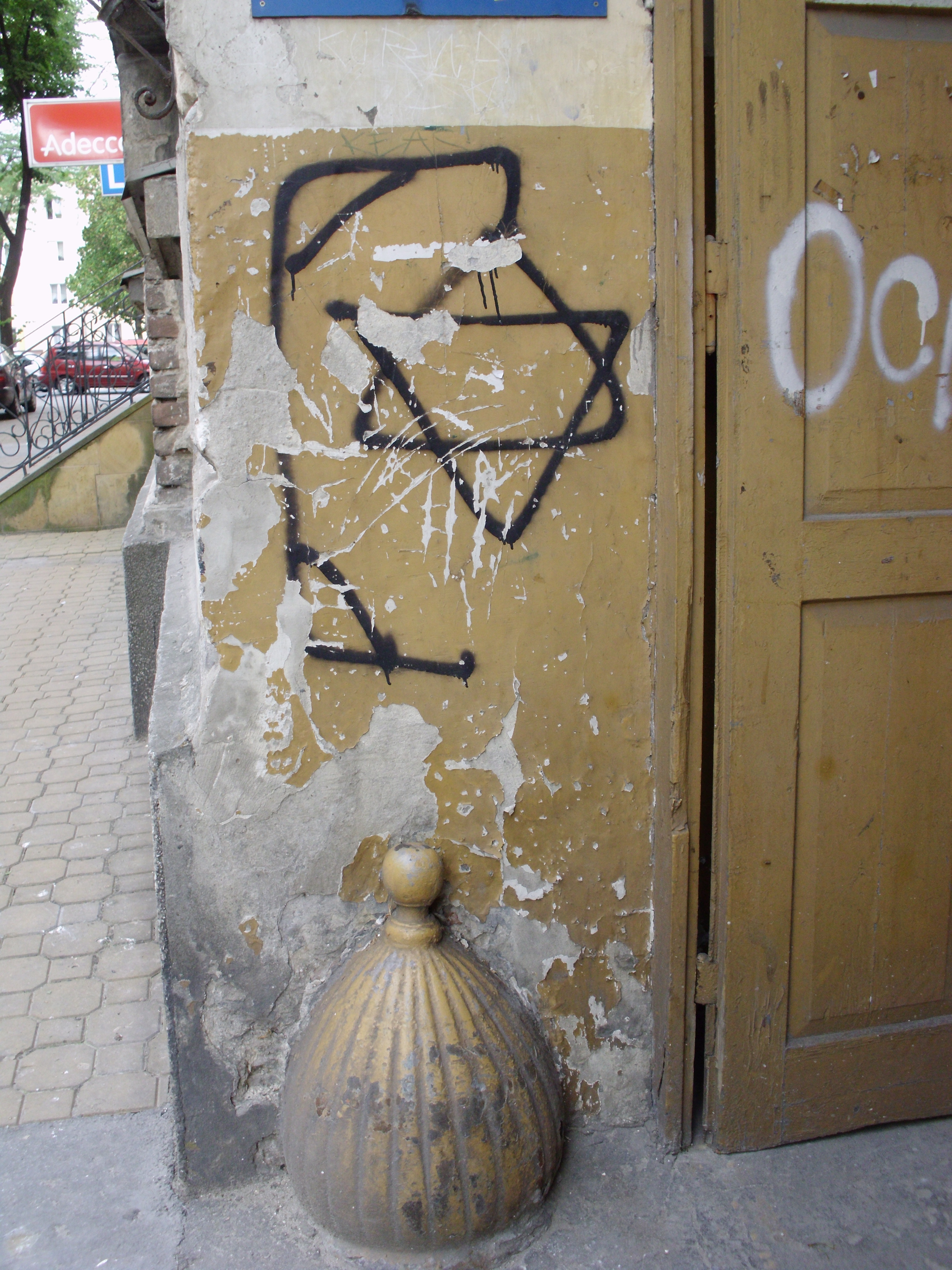
Antisemitic graffiti in Lublin depicting a Star of David hanging from gallows, c. 2012

Around 14th–16th centuries the Jews in Poland were relatively well-off, compared to Jews in other European countries or non-nobles in Poland, as shown by the term Paradisus Judaeorum (Jewish Paradise). At the onset of the 17th century, religious tolerance common began to give way to the Catholic Counter-Reformation. From the middle of the 14th century to the end of the 15th century, there were 20 anti-Jewish riots on the territory of Poland and Lithuania; while from 1534 to 1717 there were 53.

Wars of the mid-17th century resulted in vast depopulation of the Commonwealth, as over 30% of the about 10 million population has perished or emigrated. In the related 1648–1655 Cossack anti-Jewish pogroms, during the Khmelnytsky Uprising, 18,000–20,000 Jews were killed on Ukrainian territories out of a total population of 40,000.

On the other hand, despite the mentioned incidents, the Polish–Lithuanian Commonwealth was a relative haven for Jews when compared to the period of the partitions of Poland and the PLC's destruction in 1795 (see Imperial Russia and the Soviet Union, below). After an assassination attempt on the life of Alexander III of Russia, in the 1880s Russian Imperial forces began to settle Russian-speaking Lithuanian Jews in Polish-speaking areas. Financially and politically, cultural conflict emerged between the Russian-speaking Jews supported by the Russian Empire and the Poles.

Leon Khazanovich, a leader of Poalei Zion, documented anti-Jewish pogroms in 105 towns and villages between November and December 1918. Antisemitism abounded in Poland after Poland's sovereignty restoration, which included the 1937 imposition of numerus clausus upon Polish universities to restrict Jewish student admission.

While there are many examples of Poles rescuing Jews in the Holocaust, there are also instances of antisemitic incidents, when the Jewish population was certain of the indifference towards their fate from the Christian Poles. The Polish Institute of National Remembrance identified 24 pogroms against WWII Jews, the most notable of which occurred in Jedwabne in 1941. A number of incidents were recorded right after WWII (see anti-Jewish violence in Poland, 1944–1946). During the Cold War, the lingering antisemitism was exploited by the Soviet-backed communist regime to offset political threats, especially in the 1968 Polish political crisis:

The collapse of communism in Poland in 1989, allowed for the re-examination of Jewish-Polish history, with a number of events, including the Jedwabne pogrom, being discussed openly for the first time. Violent antisemitism in Poland in the 21st century is marginal compared to elsewhere. In 2022, the American civil rights group Anti-Defamation League (ADL) conducted a global survey on antisemitism. It found that 35% of Poland's people "harbour[ed] antisemitic attitudes", the second highest among the 10 European countries surveyed. Notably, the percentage was significantly lower than the previous ADL survey. Whereas, the Czulent Jewish Association, a Polish Jewish group, reported in 2023 that 488 antisemitic incidents had been recorded in 2022, 86% of which involved online harassment and insults. It noted that "Jew" was often used to smear a perceived enemy as "disloyal, an outsider and unpatriotic." Meanwhile, as per the OSCE Office for Democratic Institutions and Human Rights (ODIHR), of the 440 hate crimes prosecuted by the Police of Poland in 2022, 20% were antisemitic hate crimes, while only 6% were "anti-Muslim" hate crimes.

During Hanukkah of 2023, Polish MP Grzegorz Braun used a fire extinguisher to put out the menorah after a lighting ceremony in parliament. As a result, the Polish parliament stripped him of his immunity, allowing for his potential prosecution. On 1 May 2024, the Nożyk Synagogue in Warsaw was hit with three firebombs by a 16-year old. Poland's President Andrzej Duda condemned the firebombing.

=== Russia and the Soviet Union ===
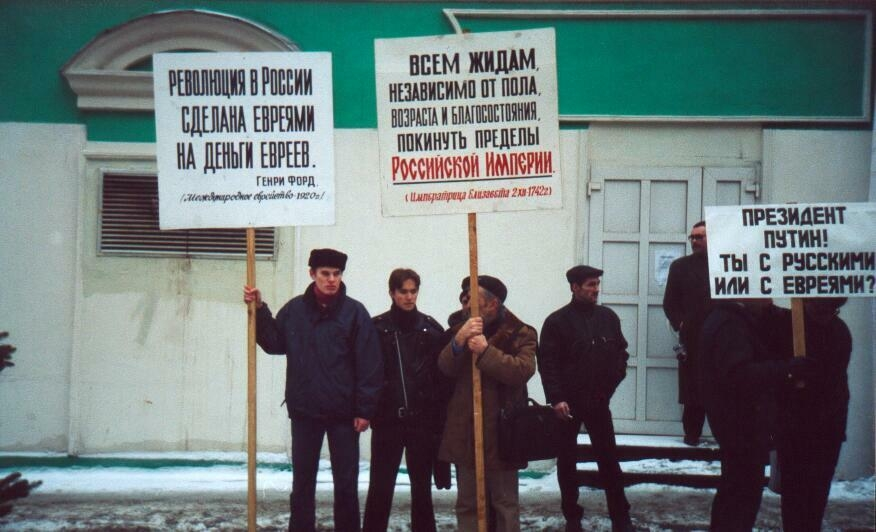
A demonstration in Russia. The antisemitic slogans cite Henry Ford and Empress Elizabeth.

The Pale of Settlement was the Western region of Imperial Russia to which Jews were restricted by the Tsarist Ukase of 1792. It consisted of the territories of former Polish–Lithuanian Commonwealth, annexed with the existing numerous Jewish population, and the Crimea (which was later cut out from the Pale). During 1881–1884, 1903–1906, and 1914–1921, waves of antisemitic pogroms swept Russian Jewish communities. At least some pogroms are believed to have been organized or supported by the Russian Okhrana (secret police). Although there is no hard evidence for this, the Russian police and army generally displayed indifference to the pogroms, for instance during the three-day First Kishinev pogrom of 1903. During this period the May Laws policy was also put into effect, banning Jews from rural areas and towns, and placing strict quotas on the number of Jews allowed into higher education and many professions. The combination of the repressive legislation and pogroms propelled mass Jewish emigration, and by 1920 more than two million Russian Jews had emigrated, most to the United States while some made aliya to the Land of Israel.

In 1903 The Protocols of the Elders of Zion, an antisemitic tractate, was fabricated by the Russian Okhrana, a literary hoax, meant to blame the Jews for Russia's problems during the period of revolutionary activity.

Even though many Old Bolsheviks were ethnically Jewish, they sought to uproot Judaism and Zionism and established the Yevsektsiya to achieve this goal. By the end of the 1940s, the Communist leadership of the former USSR had liquidated almost all Jewish organizations, including Yevsektsiya.

Joseph Stalin's antisemitic campaign of 1948–1953 against so-called "rootless cosmopolitans", destruction of the Jewish Anti-Fascist Committee, the fabrication of the "Doctors' plot", the rise of "Zionology" and subsequent activities of official organizations such as the Anti-Zionist committee of the Soviet public were officially carried out under the banner of "anti-Zionism," but the use of this term could not obscure the antisemitic content of these campaigns, and by the mid-1950s the state persecution of Soviet Jews emerged as a major human rights issue in the West and domestically. See also: Jackson–Vanik amendment, Refusenik, Pamyat. Stalin sought to segregate Russian Jews into "Soviet Zion", with the help of Komzet and OZET in 1928. The Jewish Autonomous Oblast with the center in Birobidzhan in the Russian Far East attracted only limited settlement, and never achieved Stalin's goal of an internal exile for the Jewish people.

Around the year 2000, antisemitic pronouncements, speeches, and articles were common in Russia, and there were a number of antisemitic neo-Nazi groups in the republics of the former Soviet Union, leading Pravda to declare in 2002 that "Anti-semitism is booming in Russia." Around 2015–19, there have been bombs attached to antisemitic signs, apparently aimed at Jews, and other violent incidents, including stabbings, have been recorded. Antisemitic conspiracy theories were still widespread in Russian media by 2019 as well.

=== Slovakia ===
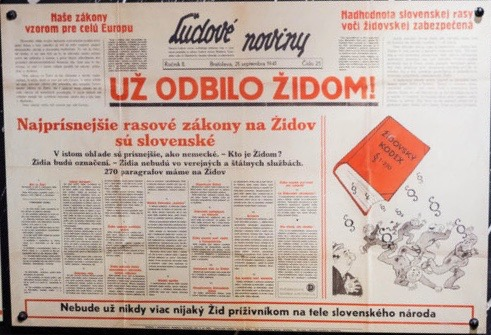
Headline of 21 September 1941 propaganda-ministry publication: "We've dealt with the Jews; the strictest anti-Jewish law is Slovakia's"

Following Jewish emancipation in 1896, many Jews in Slovakia (then Upper Hungary, part of the Kingdom of Hungary) had adopted Hungarian language and customs in order to advance. Many Jews moved to cities and joined the professions; others remained in the countryside, mostly working as artisans, merchants, and shopkeepers. Their multilingualism helped them advance in business, but put many Jews in conflict with the Slovak national revival. The leader of the Slovak national revival, Ľudovít Štúr, believed that Slovak Jews lacked a common history, culture, and society with Slovaks. Traditional religious antisemitism was joined by the stereotypical view of Jews as exploiters of poor Slovaks (economic antisemitism), and a form of "national anti-Semitism" accusing Jews of Hungarian irredentism, and later Czechoslovakism as Jews came to be associated with the Czechoslovak state. By the mid-1930s, a broad consensus of antisemitism had emerged across Slovak society.

Antisemitism in Slovakia has declined from the mid-20th century, which saw the deportation and murder of most of the Slovak Jews by the Slovak People's Party government led by Jozef Tiso. Antisemitism after the war manifested itself in events such as the Topoľčany pogrom in September 1945. More recently, politician Marian Kotleba has promoted the Zionist Occupation Government conspiracy theory and described Jews as "devils in human skin".

=== Slovenia ===
Graffiti on Maribor Synagogue, January 2009

The first noticeable antisemitic movement dates back to 1496 when the entire Jewish community in the territory of Carinthia and Styria was expelled due to the decree issued by Emperor Maximilian I. He was under strong pressure from the local nobility. The last of these evictions was issued in 1828 but restrictions on settlement and business remained until 1861.

Modern antisemitism emerged in Slovenia in the late 19th century, first among ultra-traditionalist Catholics, such as the Bishop Anton Mahnič. However, this was still a cultural and religious antisemitism, and not a racist one. Racial antisemitism was first advanced in Slovenia by some liberal nationalists, like Josip Vošnjak. At the turn of the 20th century, antisemitism spread widely due to the influence of Austrian Christian Social Movement. The founder of Slovene Christian Socialism, Janez Evangelist Krek, was fiercely antisemitic, although many of his followers were not. However, antisemitism remained a recognizable feature of conservative, ultra-Catholic, and far-right groups in Slovenia until 1945.

About 4,500 Jews lived in Slovene areas before the mass transportation to the concentration camps in 1941. Many of them were refugees from neighboring Austria, while the number of Slovenian Jews with Yugoslav citizenship was much lower. According to the 1931 census, the Jewish community in the Drava Banovina (the administrative unit corresponding to the Yugoslav part of Slovenia) had less than 1,000 members, mostly concentrated in the easternmost Slovenian region of Prekmurje. In the late 1930s, anti-Jewish legislation was adopted by the pro-German regime of the Yugoslav Prime Minister Milan Stojadinović, supported also by the largest political party in Slovenia, the conservative Slovene People's Party. The party's leader, Dr. Anton Korošec had a strong antisemitic discourse and was instrumental in the introduction of the numerus clausus in all Yugoslav universities in 1938.

The vast majority of Slovene Jewry was murdered in Auschwitz and other extermination camps. The Nazis continued deporting Slovene Jews until 1945. The once-noticeable Jewish community of Prekmurje disappeared. Only individuals have returned; many immigrated to Israel soon after 1945.

In 1954, the local Communist party destroyed the last standing synagogue in Slovenia – the synagogue of Murska Sobota, which had survived the two years of Nazi occupation between 1944 and 1945. Before the final destruction, the synagogue was robbed and burned by the members of the party.

After returning from the concentration camps, many Jews realized they had been dispossessed by the new Communist government. Jewish people were automatically marked as an upper class, although the Nazis took most of the property. Jews who still owned houses or larger apartments were allowed to live in one room; the rest of their properties were owned by the Communist party. Some of the Jews who opposed this policy were told they were "welcome to leave at any time". Jews were also told it was better for them to leave if they wanted peace from OZNA.

During the Yugoslav socialist period, Jews were allowed to leave to go to Israel. However, if they decided to go, all of their properties and any possessions were automatically taken by the Communist party with no possibility of return. After the dissolution of Yugoslavia, some properties were returned to them. Many Jews who had immigrated from Slovenia to Israel have said they are now too old and too tired to start the process of returning.

In January 2009, during the Gaza War, the exterior of the Maribor Synagogue was defaced with antisemitic graffiti, including Juden raus. Although the synagogue is protected by security cameras, the culprits were never found. The synagogue was again vandalized with threatening graffiti in January 2025.

=== Spain ===
Expulsions of Jews in Europe from 1100 to 1600

Jews in Islamic-occupied Spain, Al-Andalus, were second-class dhimmis who were targeted in pogroms such as the 1066 Granada massacre. In 1492, via the Alhambra Decree, King Ferdinand and Queen Isabella ordered the expulsion of an estimated 800,000 Jews from the country, and thus put an end to the largest and most distinguished Jewish community in Europe. The coercive baptisms eventually produced the phenomenon of the conversos (Marranos), the Inquisition, and statutes of "blood purity" five centuries before the race laws in Nazi Germany. From the end of the nineteenth century, Jews have been perceived as conspirators, alongside the notion of a universal Jewish conspiracy to control the world. Following the Soviet revolution and the founding of the Spanish Communist Party in 1920, such "anti-Spanish forces" were primarily identified with the "destructive communist virus," often considered to be guided by the Jews.

During the Spanish Civil War, the alliance between Franco's faction and Nazi Germany opened the way for the emergence of antisemitism in the Spanish Right. It was during the 1960s that the first Spanish neo-fascist and neo-Nazi groups appeared, such as CEDADE. Later on, the Spanish neo-Nazis attempted to use antisemitic discourse to explain the political transition to democracy (1976–1982) following the death of General Franco. It drew on the same ideas that had been expressed in 1931 when the Second Spanish Republic was proclaimed – that political turning points could be explained as the result of various "intrigues". From 1948 until 1986, Israel was not recognized by Spain, and Israel and Spain had no diplomatic ties. In 1978, Jews were recognized as full citizens in Spain, and today the Jewish population numbers about 40,000 – 1 percent of Spain's population, 20,000 of whom are registered in the Jewish communities. The majority live in the larger cities of Spain on the Iberian Peninsula, North Africa or the islands.

Many of the prejudices cultivated during the Franco years persist in the twenty-first century. According to some, derived from the fact that almost all Spaniards are Catholic, and Spain remains to this day one of the most homogeneous Western countries, Spanish Judeophobia reflects a national obsession with religious and ethnic unity which is based on the conception of an imaginary "internal enemy" plotting the downfall of the Catholic religion and the traditional social order. However, this assumption clashes with the fact that 21st-century Spain is one of the most secularized countries in Europe, with only 3% of Spaniards considering religion as one of their three most important values and thus not linking it to their national or personal identity. Furthermore, in modern Spain there is not an "internal enemy" scare but in far-right circles, which are more often focused against Muslim immigration as well as Catalan and Basque separatism, way more visible phenomena. Modern antisemitic-like attitudes in Spain are actually related to the perceived abusive policies of the State of Israel against Palestinians and in the international scene rather than to any kind of religious or identity obsession, and it has been defined by Jewish authors as an "antisemitism without antisemites."

Pablo Iglesias, the founder of the Spanish political party Unidas Podemos, has a history of antisemitic remarks including: "the Holocaust was a mere bureaucratic problem," "the great Wall Street companies are practically all in the hands of Jews," and "the Jewish lobby supports initiatives against the peoples of the world," among others.

=== Sweden ===
After Germany and Austria, Sweden has the highest rate of antisemitic incidents in Europe, though the Netherlands reports a higher rate of antisemitism in some years. A government study in 2006 estimated that 15% of Swedes agree with the statement: "The Jews have too much influence in the world today". 5% of the total adult population and 39% of adult Muslims "harbour systematic antisemitic views". The former prime minister Göran Persson described these results as "surprising and terrifying". However, the rabbi of Stockholm's Orthodox Jewish community, Meir Horden, said that "It's not true to say that the Swedes are anti-Semitic. Some of them are hostile to Israel because they support the weak side, which they perceive the Palestinians to be."

In October 2010, The Forward reported on the current state of Jews and the level of antisemitism in Sweden. Henrik Bachner, a writer, and professor of history at the University of Lund, claimed that members of the Swedish Parliament have attended anti-Israel rallies where the Israeli flag was burned while the flags of Hamas and Hezbollah were waved, and the rhetoric was often antisemitic—not just anti-Israel. But such public rhetoric is not branded hateful and denounced.

Charles Small, director of the Yale University Initiative for the Study of antisemitism, stated that "Sweden is a microcosm of contemporary antisemitism. It's a form of acquiescence to radical Islam, which is diametrically opposed to everything Sweden stands for." Per Gudmundson, the chief editorial writer for Svenska Dagbladet, has sharply criticized politicians whom he claims offer "weak excuses" for Muslims accused of antisemitic crimes. "Politicians say these kids are poor and oppressed, and we have made them hate. They are, in effect, saying the behavior of these kids is in some way our fault."

Two documentaries, one produced in 2013 and another in 2015, secretly filmed reporters walking around Malmö wearing a kippah. In the 2013 documentary, the reporter only received strange looks and giggles, but in the 2015 documentary, in the mainly Muslim Rosengård neighborhood, the reporter was physically and verbally assaulted and had to flee. Fred Kahn, a leader of the local Jewish community, claimed that most incidents are committed by Muslims or Arabs.

=== Switzerland ===
- History of the Jews in Switzerland#Antisemitism in Switzerland

=== Ukraine ===
There have been Jews in Ukraine since the Greek colonies of the Black Sea coast had their Jewish traders. Antisemitism has existed since at least the time of the Rus Primary Chronicle. Leaders of the Ukrainian nationalists of OUN (b) participated in the Holocaust during World War II. In Ukraine violence against Jews and antisemitic graffiti remains. Antisemitism has declined since Ukrainian independence in 1991.

=== United Kingdom ===
In 2004, members of the UK Parliament set up an inquiry into antisemitism, which published its findings in 2006. The inquiry stated that "until recently, the prevailing opinion both within the Jewish community and beyond [had been] that antisemitism had receded to the point that it existed only on the margins of society." It found a reversal of this progress since 2000. As of 2014, 9 percent of the British population held negative attitudes towards Jews. In 2024, there was a spike in antisemitic incidents. According to the Community Security Trust, nearly 2,000 antisemitic incidents were recorded in UK in the first half of 2024, marking the highest number ever documented in a six-month period.

On October 2, 2025, the morning of Yom Kippur, Prestwich resident Jihad al-Shamie attacked the Heaton Park Hebrew Congregation in Manchester, driving a car into pedestrians before getting out and stabbing worshipers. The attacker killed one person and the police shot another by accident while also shooting the suspect and three others were seriously injured. The attack was declared an act of terror later that same day.

In March and April 2026, approximately 10 attacks were conducted that targeted the Jewish community in London. The attacks have involved arson, explosive devices and chemicals, and targeted Jewish schools, synagogues and charities. Responsibility for many of the attacks was claimed by Harakat Ashab al-Yamin al-Islamia, which is believed to be a front group for Iran's Islamic Revolutionary Guard Corps (IRGC). The IRGC allegedly outsourced the acts to local criminals to maintain plausible deniability. Counter-terrorism police are investigating the attacks, resulting to date in 27 arrests and the allocation of additional police resources to prevent further violence.

== See also ==
- Anti-Jewish laws
  - Anti-Jewish legislation in pre-war Nazi Germany
    - Nuremberg Laws
- Antisemitic trope
- Antisemitism
  - Antisemitism by country
    - Antisemitism in 21st-century Germany
- Dreyfus Affair
- Eichmann in Jerusalem, a 1963 book by the philosopher and political thinker Hannah Arendt
- European interwar dictatorships
- European Jewish Congress
- Persecution of Jews
  - Expulsions and exoduses of Jews
    - Jewish diaspora
      - Jewish ethnic divisions
        - Ashkenazi Jews
        - Sephardic Jews
- Fascism in Europe
  - Fascism and ideology
  - History of fascism (pre-1922)
  - History of fascism (1922–1945)
  - History of fascism (1945–present)
    - Neo-fascism in Europe
    - Neo-Nazism in Europe
- Hilsner Affair
- History of antisemitism
  - Timeline of antisemitism
- History of the Jews in Europe
- Human rights in Europe
- Jewish history
  - Timeline of Jewish history
- Secondary antisemitism
  - Aftermath of the Holocaust
    - Anti-Jewish violence in Central and Eastern Europe, 1944–1946
    - Anti-Jewish violence in Poland, 1944–1946
- Stereotypes of Jews
- History of the Jews during World War II
  - The Holocaust
  - The Holocaust in Poland
    - Timeline of the Holocaust
- The Origins of Totalitarianism, a 1951 book by Hannah Arendt
- Nazi racial theories
  - Racial antisemitism
    - Racial policy of Nazi Germany
- Racism in Europe
- Radical right (Europe)
- Radical right (United States)
- Religious antisemitism
  - Antisemitism in Christianity
  - Antisemitism in Islam
    - Antisemitism in the Arab world
      - History of the Jews under Muslim rule
      - Islamic–Jewish relations
      - Jewish exodus from the Muslim world
      - Racism in Muslim communities
      - Relations between Nazi Germany and the Arab world
      - Xenophobia and racism in the Middle East
- New antisemitism
- Normalization of antisemitism
