= Miluj blížneho svojho =

Slovak documentary

Miluj blížneho svojho ("Love thy neighbor") (2004) is a Slovak-language documentary by filmmaker Dušan Hudec about the September 1945 Topoľčany pogrom, a post-Holocaust anti-Jewish riot in which more than 40 Jews were injured.

== Background ==
Most of the Jews in Topoľčany, Slovakia were killed in the Holocaust, which was perpetrated jointly by the collaborationist Slovak State and Nazi Germany. A few hundred survived and returned to the town after the war. Their efforts to regain property that had been "aryanized" increased the hostility and antisemitism of the non-Jewish Slovaks, who began to mount a campaign of intimidation to encourage the Jews to renounce their claims and leave the country. More than 40 Jews were injured in a September 1945 riot, referred to as the Topoľčany pogrom, which became the best known instance of postwar anti-Jewish violence in Slovakia. In the years following the riot, many Jews emigrated. There is no longer a Jewish community in Topoľčany.

== Censored statement ==
During the filming of the documentary, an elderly resident of Topoľčany said, "Jews and Gypsies are the worst scum under the sun. While they are in the world, there will be no order". (Note: Slovak: Židi, Cigáni, to je najväčšia háveď pod slnkom, pamätajte si to, pokiaľ tí budú na svete, poriadok nebude) Richard Rybníček, the director-general of STV, which had commissioned the documentary, asked Hudec to remove the statement because of concern that it violated the Broadcasting and Retransmission Act on protection of human dignity and humanity. Hudec disagreed and strongly objected, telling reporters that without the line, the film would be a study of past racism in Slovakia, but that the inclusion of the statement brought the historical issues into the present. Despite the general agreement of several lawyers that the statement did not violate the law, the station insisted on its removal.

The Central Federation of Jewish Religious Congregations condemned the removal of the statement, stating that the censorship was a "warning signal about the present direction of the Slovak public TV". It raised concerns about Rybníček's connections with far-right groups. In response, a manager of STV stated that "We would not like this problem to be politicised in any way."

== Documentary ==
The documentary was aired on Slovak television on 24 May 2004. Its release had been delayed 24 hours due to the controversy over the removed statement and the director's request for time to consider the removal request.

== Reception ==
Slovak historian Ivan Kamenec praised the documentary for bringing the postwar Jewish history to the attention of a wider audience. The Slovak newspaper Slovo said that the documentary was probably the best Slovak documentary to premiere in 2004.

Some commentators accused the documentary of anti-Catholicism, pointing out that the church in Topoľčany is the main visual focus, and the documentary did not mention that some Catholic Church officials opposed the Holocaust. The Slovak writer Peter Bielik criticized the film, citing contemporary reports claiming that "the Jews behaved very arrogantly and imperiously, trying to systematically occupy important positions in the economic, public, and political spheres". Because of the controversy over these remarks, he withdrew from consideration for director of the National Memory Institute.
