= Svedectvo =

Slovak magazine

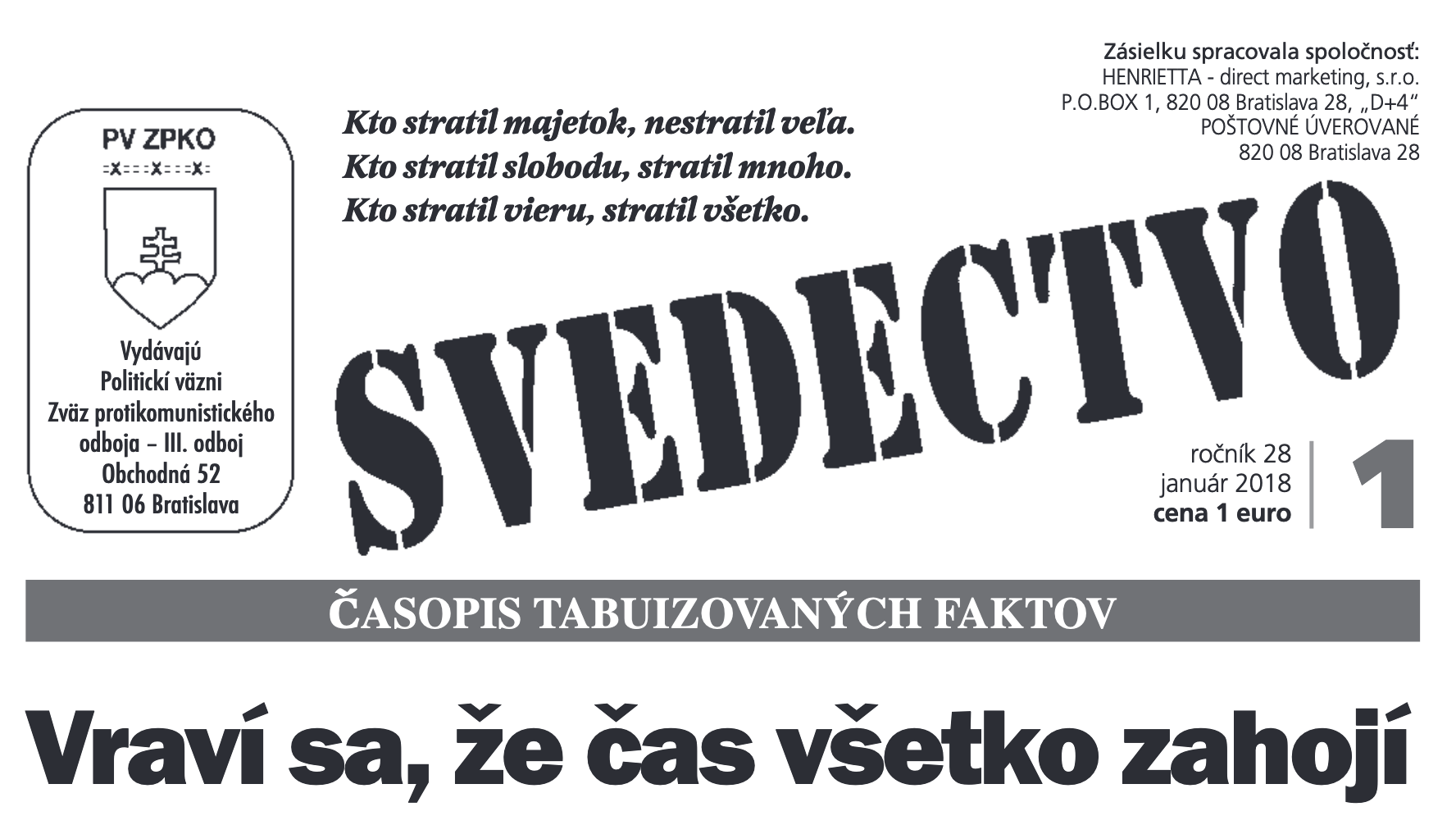
Svedectvo, January 2018

Svedectvo (Testimony) is the official journal of the PV ZPKO (Political Prisoners' Association of Anti-Communist Resistance), an organization which split from the Confederation of Slovak Political Prisoners in 1999. It is noted for its far-right orientation and apologist publications on the history of the Slovak State—especially those defending convicted war criminals.

== Content ==
The subtitle of the journal is tabuizovaných faktov (taboo facts).

Svedectvo published an article claiming that Otomar Kubala was "great patriot, a heroic fighter for Slovak freedom and state independence" and calling for "glory and honor to his memory, which will never perish". Kubala was a radical antisemite who led the Hlinka Guard, which carried out the deportation of Jews from Slovakia. Even admirers of the Slovak State regime consider him too extreme. A member of the editorial board, Ivan Mrva, published an article in the journal in 2015 asserting that "The last time [14 March, the anniversary of the 1939 Slovak declaration of independence] was worthily celebrated with the presence of the president, government, public figures and the diplomatic corps was in the year 1945, unfortunately the Soviet cannons were already rumbling somewhere in the east." The article noted that the president and government representatives were sentenced to death on 14 March 1947 but omitted the crimes of which they were convicted.

In an article, editor-in-chief Eva Zelenayová criticized the head of the National Memory Institute, Ondrej Krajňák, for describing the Slovak State "as a rampaging regime, with political prisoners tortured at Ilava, commission of mass murder, Jewish transports to Auschwitz, mass extermination of Jews, Roma, persecution of political opponents." According to political scientist Nadya Nedelsky, the journal's writers relativize the crimes of the Slovak State regime, arguing that the achievement of Slovak independence was worth the crimes of the regime—up to and including genocide. Articles in the magazine mythologize the regime's leaders, while often blaming the victims as deserving what they received. The lack of nuance is partly due to the format of short, one page articles which lack space for details. According to Nedelsky, antisemitism is often present as an undercurrent and sometimes overtly.

Svedectvo also publishes articles on former political prisoners of the Communist regime. The journal claimed that "ĽSNS [Marian Kotleba's party] is the first authentic right-wing party to get into parliament and dedicate its program to defending the Christian values of our state". ĽSNS is a far-right, neo-Nazi party.

== Personnel ==
Editor-in-chief Eva Zelenayová, formerly an MP of People's Party – Movement for a Democratic Slovakia, declared her support for Kotleba's party in a 2017 interview. Peter Bielik, who attracted controversy with an article written for a different magazine, was a member of the editorial board. Ján Košiar, a Catholic priest and Kotleba supporter, was the chairperson of the editorial board in 2017.

== Controversies ==
Svedectvo has been criticized by Slovakia's Jewish community.

One of the National Memory Institute's staff historians, Martin Lacko, was fired in 2016 for promoting the Slovak State. In an article in Svedectvo, Lacko claimed that Ferdinand Ďurčanský and others were unfairly judged as war criminals, suggesting that they were actually heroes.

=== Funding ===
PV ZPKO received a subsidy from the Ministry of the Interior in 2017 of 76,000 euros, of which 24,200 were spent on the publication of Svedectvo. In 2018, the organization received 80,000 euros. Ministry of the Interior officials reviewed the publication following criticism of its far-right content, but argued for continuing the subsidy because more space was devoted to anti-Communist dissidents than apologia for the Slovak State regime. According to a spokesperson for the Ministry of the Interior, a meeting was held during which "Representatives of the Association [PV ZPKO] were warned in strong terms to ensure objectivity and to respect the principles of the Slovak Republic." However, the Ministry of Education—which commissioned PV ZPKO to write a textbook on the Communist regime—did not take issue with Svedectvo's content.

== Sources ==
- Nedelsky, Nadya (2016). ""The Struggle for the Memory of the Nation": Post-Communist Slovakia and its World War II Past". Human Rights Quarterly. 38 (4): 969–992. doi:10.1353/hrq.2016.0053. S2CID 151419238.
