= Institute of National Memory =

Institute of National Memory may refer to:

- National Memory Institute (Slovakia)
- Ukrainian Institute of National Memory
- Institute of National Remembrance: Commission for the Prosecution of Crimes against the Polish Nation
