= Peter Bielik =

Slovak historian

- Known for: Controversial statements about Holocaust survivors

Peter Bielik is a Slovak historian, who withdrew his candidacy for director of the National Memory Institute due to controversy over his remarks blaming Jewish Holocaust survivors for the September 1945 Topoľčany pogrom.

== Life ==
Bielik was an editor of Svedectvo ("Testimony"), a journal published by the Political Prisoners' Association of Anti-Communist Resistance (PV ZPKO), and an official representative of the PV ZPKO. The journal, which has been criticized by Slovakia's Jewish community, is noted for undercurrents of antisemitism and frequently publishing apologetic, mythologizing articles about convicted Slovak nationalist war criminals.

Following the death of Ján Langoš, the director of the National Memory Institute, in 2006, the rightwing Slovak National Party (SNS) proposed Bielik as a candidate for his replacement. In an article the previous year, Bielik had criticized the documentary Miluj blížneho svojho ("Love thy neighbor"), about the Topoľčany pogrom, because he felt it was anti-Catholic. Instead, Bielik cited contemporary reports stating that "the Jews behaved very arrogantly and imperiously, trying to systematically occupy important positions in the economic, public, and political spheres". In his article, Bielik made no mention of the Holocaust, which claimed the lives of the majority of Slovak Jews, and was perpetrated by the collaborationist Slovak State in concert with Nazi Germany.

Bielik presents Slovaks who stole from Jews during the war as victims of the Jews' efforts to regain their property, and the Jews as ungrateful to the majority of Slovaks to whom they supposedly owed their lives. His perspective was criticized by the contemporary Slovak media, which identified him as a supporter of the Slovak State. The Slovak Jewish newspaper Delet criticized Bielik for blaming Jews for the Topoľčany pogrom and accused him of minimizing the Holocaust. American historian Nadya Nedelsky compared Bielik's portrayal of the Jews with that of President Jozef Tiso, a noted Holocaust perpetrator in Slovakia: to Tiso, Slovak people were victims saving themselves by deporting Jews, while to Bielik, the Slovaks are "victims and saviors of these [Jewish] perpetrators". As a result of the controversy, he withdrew his candidacy for the directorship. However, he still ran for the Board of Directors, whose nominees have to be approved by the Slovak Parliament; he was unsuccessful.

In 2008, Bielik published a book titled Masoneria – nieszczęście naszych czasów ("Freemasonry — the plague of our time"), in which he blamed Freemasons for a host of social problems, including "revolts, upheavals, revolutions, murders... heresy, secularization, atheism, spiritualism, reincarnation, radical feminism, pornography, artificial contraception, sterilization, divorce, abortion and euthanasia" according to the Polish magazine Focus.
