= Miskolc pogrom =

The Miskolc pogrom led to death of one accused Jewish black marketeer, the wounding of another, and subsequently the death of a Jewish policeman in Miskolc, Hungary, July 30 and August 1, 1946. Economic hardship and anti-Semitism motivated the riots.

Lieutenant General László Piros participated in the riots.

Blood libel rumors had led to violence in Kunmadaras and Teplicany, and were present in Miskolc before the riot. Mátyás Rákosi had given a speech in Miskolc some days before the riot attacking "speculators" and suggesting death for them. Reports (likely from the police) circulated of the arrest of three black marketeers, two of them Jewish. The prisoners were to be moved to an internment camp on the morning of the 31st. A mob awaited them, displaying signs with slogans like "Death to the Jews" and "Death to the Black Marketeers." The mob attacked. One man was murdered, another beaten severely, and a third (not Jewish) escaped. That afternoon, police appeared in force and arrested sixteen people for the lynching. The crowd attacked the police, occupied the police station, and murdered a Jewish policeman.

Hungarian Communist Party propaganda at the time featured posters and brochures denouncing "speculators" depicted with images of Jewish caricatures; likely this was to deflect public grievances about hyperinflation and otherwise poor economic conditions.
