= Kunmadaras pogrom =

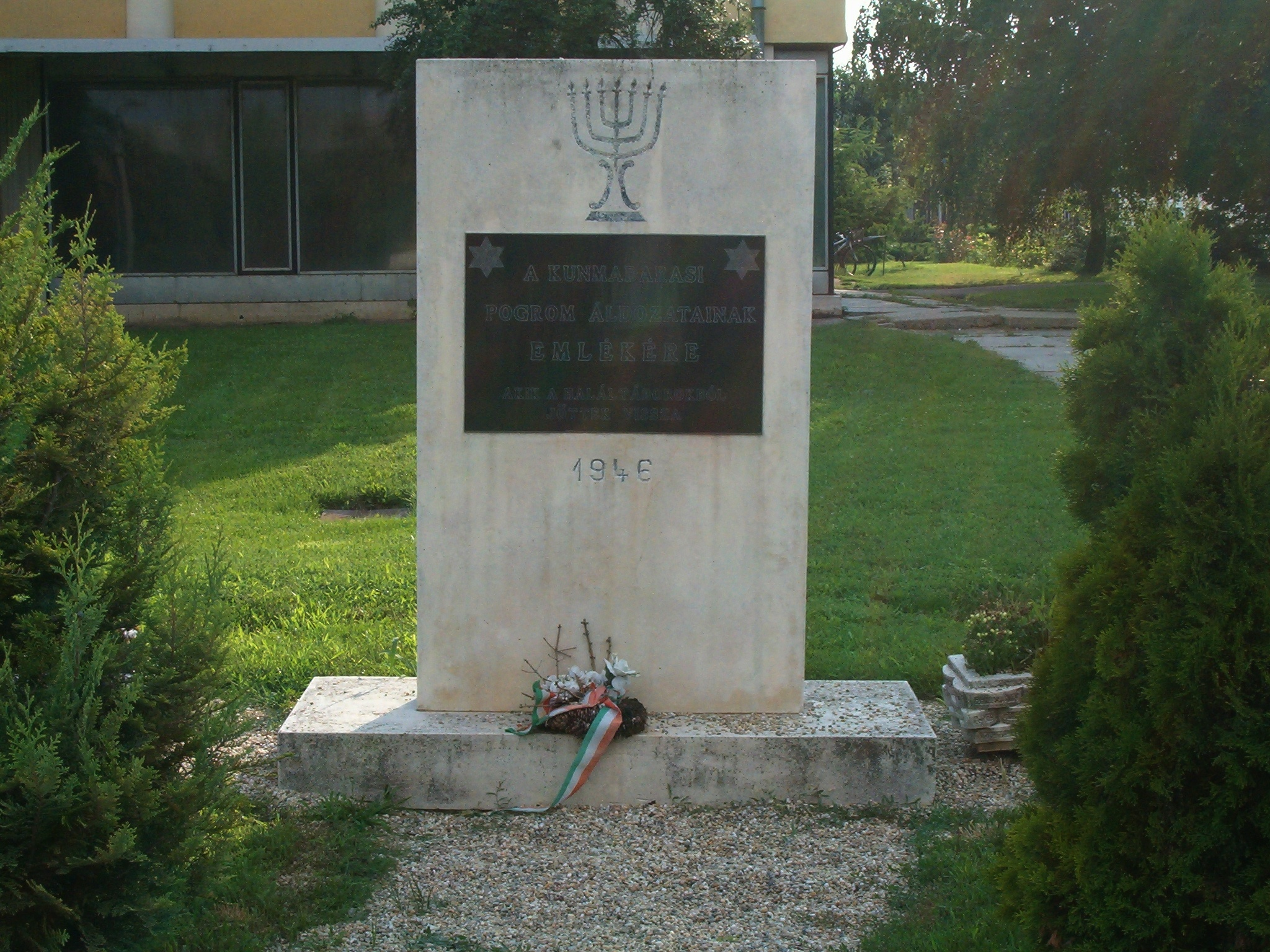
Pogrom monument in Kunmadaras

The Kunmadaras pogrom was an antisemitic pogrom that took place shortly after the Second World War in Kunmadaras, Hungary, on 21 May 1948. According to the Jewish Telegraphic Agency, three Jews were killed and up to 20 were injured.

The riot began in the marketplace as a spontaneous protest against a suspected profiteer. Since the traditional occupation of the Jews in the area was trade, the image of a profiteer was conflated with that of a Jew. Thus, the riot grew into an anti-Jewish pogrom.

== Aftermath ==
After the initial riots, they were taken away to concentration camps, their homes were looted, and their possessions stolen as they were not expected to return alive.

The historian Péter Apor made a peculiar observation about the subsequent trial of the pogromists: "The People's Tribunal managed to produce a narrative of an antisemitic pogrom without involving the Jewish victims." The pogrom was portrayed as a resurgence of fascism pitched against the nascent people's democracy.

On 26 July 1946, ten rioters were convicted of having instigated and participated in the violence. Three were sentenced to death. Two others were sentenced to 15-years in prison with hard labor each. A police officer who was involved received a 6-year sentence, while four youths were sentenced to reform schools. Several other defendants were acquitted.

== See also ==
- Anti-Jewish violence in Eastern Europe, 1944–1946
