= Topoľčany pogrom =

Riot in Topoľčany, Slovakia

- Part of postwar anti-Jewish violence in Slovakia
- Location: Topoľčany, Czechoslovakia
- Date: 24 September 1945; 8:00 to noon
- Target: Slovak Jews
- Deaths: none
- Injuries: 47 or 48

The Topoľčany pogrom was an antisemitic riot in Topoľčany, Slovakia, on 24 September 1945 and the best-known incident of postwar violence against Jews in Slovakia. The underlying cause was resurgent antisemitism directed at Jewish Holocaust survivors who demanded the return of property that had been stolen during the Holocaust. Rumors spread that a local Catholic school would be nationalized and the nuns who taught there replaced by Jewish teachers.

On the morning of the incident, women demonstrated against the nationalization of the school, blaming Jews. That same day, a Jewish doctor was vaccinating children at the school. He was accused of poisoning non-Jewish children, sparking a riot. The police were unable to prevent it, and a local garrison of soldiers joined in. About forty-seven Jews were injured, and fifteen had to be hospitalized.

In the immediate aftermath of the events, international coverage embarrassed the Czechoslovak authorities and the Czechoslovak Communist Party exploited the riots to accuse the democratic authorities of ineffectiveness.

A 2004 documentary film about the rioting, Miluj blížneho svojho ("Love thy neighbor"), sparked increased discussion of the history of these events. The next year, the mayor of Topoľčany issued an official apology.

== The Holocaust ==
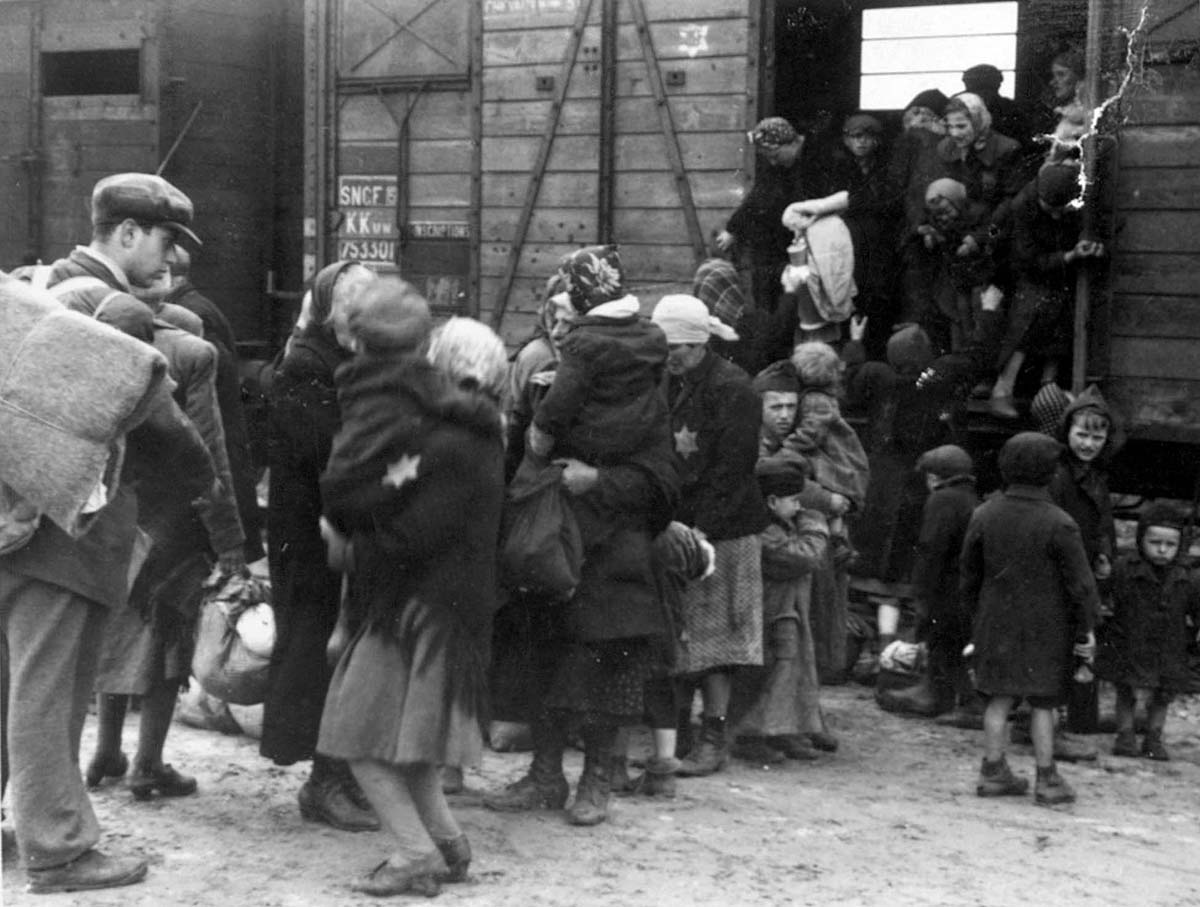
Carpathian Ruthenian Jews arrive at Auschwitz in 1944.

On 14 March 1939, the Slovak State proclaimed its independence from Czechoslovakia under the protection of Nazi Germany. The persecution of Jews played a key role in the Slovak State's domestic policy. The Slovak State liquidated some 10,000 Jewish-owned businesses and turned 2,300 over to "Aryan" owners, depriving most Slovak Jews of their livelihoods. The September 1941 "Jewish Code", based on the Nuremberg Laws, required Jews to wear yellow armbands, banned intermarriage, and conscripted able-bodied Jews for forced labor. In 1942, 57,000 Jews, two-thirds of the Jews in Slovakia at the time, were deported. Most of them were murdered in Auschwitz or other death camps. During and after the fall 1944 Slovak National Uprising, Jews were again targeted for extermination; of the 25,000 remaining in Slovakia some 13,500 were deported (largely to Auschwitz) and hundreds murdered in Slovakia.

The Jewish community in Topoľčany, a midsize town 80 kilometres (50 mi) east of the capital, Bratislava, was one of the wealthiest in the country. Most Jews made a living in trade or business; they owned 320 of 615 registered businesses. Other Jews were professionals, making up two-thirds of doctors and 57% of lawyers. Of the 12,000 residents of Topoľčany in 1942, some 3,000 were Jewish. On the 1930 census, about one-third of Jews registered themselves as Jewish by nationality, while the remainder declared themselves ethnic Germans, Hungarians, or Slovaks. Although there was little social mixing between the predominantly Orthodox Jews and devoutly Catholic Slovaks, there were also few overt antisemitic incidents before the war. Jews participated in political life, having their own political party and holding seats on the town council.

After 1938, Topoľčany became a "bastion" of the antisemitic, rightwing Slovak People's Party, and the majority of its residents supported the regime's anti-Jewish policies, including deportation. 89 Jewish businesses were confiscated, mostly by members of the Slovak People's Party. According to Israeli historian Robert Büchler, most "Aryanizers" were not from Topoľčany but opportunistic newcomers. However, many neighbors benefited in smaller ways from anti-Jewish persecution, such as buying property at below-market auctions. Czech historians Hana Kubátová and Michal Kubát quote Holocaust survivors who said that their non-Jewish friends turned on them and profited from anti-Jewish persecution. Many Jews from Topoľčany were deported in 1942 and murdered, but some managed to survive by agreeing to work as forced laborers at Nováky camp in Slovakia, which was liberated during the 1944 uprising. The prisoners fled to the mountains and many survived the war in hiding or fighting with the partisans. The number of Holocaust survivors returning to the town after the war has been estimated at 550, about 700, or 750. Most of the survivors had been socioeconomically advantaged compared to other Jews and leveraged their wealth to avoid deportation to extermination camps. Among the survivors in Topoľčany, there were a disproportionate number of intact families and children compared to other locations.

== After liberation ==
Towards the end of the war, the fascist regime tried to incite hatred for their own political ends by fabricating claims that Jews would take violent revenge on those who had stolen property. They also spread false rumors that Jewish property owners had reoccupied estates in Sicily after liberation in 1943, and shot Aryanizers. After the liberation of Slovakia by the Red Army in March and April 1945, Holocaust survivors from Topoľčany faced a resurgence of antisemitism. According to Slovak historian Ivan Kamenec, their presence became an "open and silent reproach" to those Slovaks who had stood by or supported the persecution of Jews. Many survivors attempted to regain the property that they had owned before the war. Those who had stolen Jewish property were reluctant to return it. Former partisans, or individuals claiming to have been partisans, had also appropriated some of the stolen property, in their view a rightful reward for their opposition to Nazism. Jana Šišjaková also highlights the fascist regime's propaganda's lingering influence on perceptions of Jews.

These two groups mounted a campaign of intimidation—rioting, looting, assaults, and threats—aimed at forcing Jews to leave and to give up their property claims. According to Büchler, "the authorities did little to protect" Holocaust survivors, instead casting their demands for property restitution and equal rights as "provocative". Meanwhile, officials ostensibly sympathetic to the Jews advised them to "behave" as to avoid inciting violence against them. One of the first post-liberation riots occurred in the eastern Slovak city of Košice on 2 May, before the end of the war. The Topoľčany pogrom is considered the most severe or notorious anti-Jewish riot in postwar Slovakia. Overall, at least thirty-six Jews were murdered and more than one hundred injured between 1945 and 1948 in Slovakia, according to Polish historian Anna Cichopek.

For four weeks prior to the riot, antisemites in Topoľčany distributed anti-Jewish propaganda and physically harassed Jews. In early September, nuns who taught at a local Catholic school for girls heard that their institution was about to be nationalized, and that they would be replaced. Although many Slovak schools were nationalized in 1945, rumors that it was due to a Jewish conspiracy and that Jewish teachers would replace gentiles were unfounded. The mothers of children at the school petitioned the government not to nationalize it and accused Jews of trying to take over the school for the benefit of Jewish children. On Sunday, 23 September 1945, people threw stones at a young Jewish man at a train station and vandalized a house inhabited by Jews in nearby Žabokreky. The next day, gentile Slovaks gathered on the streets and chanted antisemitic slogans; a few Jews were assaulted and their homes burgled. Policemen declined to intervene based on unfounded rumors that Jews had killed four children in Topoľčany. In Chynorany rumor held that thirty children had been murdered by Jews; at least one Jew was attacked and others were robbed.

== 24 September riot ==
At 8:00 on 24 September in Topoľčany, 60 women—most of them mothers of local children—went to the local district national committee (ONV) to demand that the nationalization be halted and Jewish children expelled from the school. This was part of a larger pattern in which women, who had been among the most fervent supporters of the Slovak People's Party, played a central role in fomenting antisemitic demonstrations and violence. The deputy chair of the ONV allegedly told them "to take guns and go for the Jews". Another official in the ONV supposedly said that the proposed nationalization was none of their business. The school inspector for the city intervened, trying to convince the protestors that the rumors of nationalization were not based in fact. By this time, about 160 people were demonstrating outside of the office and circulating rumors of Jewish teachers replacing the nuns and Jews destroying Christian religious symbols. Other rumors claimed that "Jews do not work and still enjoy above average lifestyles and are involved in illegal business".

Away with Jews, Jews are guilty of everything, expel Jewish children from our schools, and prohibit Jewish doctors, the Bergers, from vaccinating our children!

— Antisemitic slogans attributed to the rioters

When the women left the office, they began to chant antisemitic slogans and headed towards the school. The local police office, consisting of seven men, attempted to disperse them, but failed. The women began to accuse a local Jewish doctor, Karol Berger, who was at the school that day to vaccinate seven- and eight-year-old children, of poisoning them instead. This precipitated the large-scale violence that was to follow. When they arrived at the school, the women broke inside. Misinterpreting the cries made by children upset by the rioting, they accosted Berger, shouting "You Jew, you poison our children!". Berger was taken outside and handed over to the crowd. With a Jewish soldier, he managed to escape and hid in the police office before joining other Jewish victims in the hospital later that day. Cichopek and Kamenec estimate that 200 to 300 people of the 9,000 residents of Topoľčany participated in the riot, physically assaulting local Jews on the street and burglarizing their homes.

Jews sheltering at the police station were protected by the policemen. Teachers at the school resisted demands to turn over Jewish children. However, when the city council called in twenty or thirty soldiers stationed nearby to restore order, most instead joined the rioters. Soldiers had also attacked Jews during the Kraków pogrom a month earlier in Poland. According to one report, the commander of the army unit was inexperienced and ineffective, unable to prevent his men from answering the call to "Soldiers come with us to beat the Jews!" Offering escort to the police headquarters, soldiers led Jews out of apartments only to turn them over to the rioters. At noon, a special auxiliary unit finally managed to put an end to the violence, and the streets were quiet by 13:00 although smaller groups still tried to accost Jews. Reinforcements of policemen from Bratislava, an hour's drive away, were requested at 9:30 but did not arrive until 18:00, when the riot was already over. Municipal authorities responded sluggishly to the unfolding events, not denouncing the rumors that had led to violence until 18:45.

Forty-seven or forty-eight Jews were injured, and fifteen of them had to be hospitalized.

== Aftermath ==
[A]ccording to all signs, all these described events are organised, organised by Aryanisers who herewith wanted to prevent the restitution of property.

— Ondrej Weiss and Ernest Kohn, survivors from a nearby village

The next day, between nine and eleven of the most active rioters were arrested by the policemen from Bratislava; most were young men between the age of seventeen and twenty-four. Later arrests brought the total number to some fifty civilians arrested; most were imprisoned either at Ilava labor camp or the prison in Topoľčany. Separately, the military arrested the twenty soldiers who participated in the riot. An investigation by the Health Commission found that the vaccines delivered by Berger were not harmful.

Along with similar incidents elsewhere in Slovakia and in Poland, the rioting in Topoľčany drew international condemnation that embarrassed the Czechoslovak authorities. Only two Slovak newspapers, Čas and Pravda, published articles relating to the rioting, the first of which was published six days later. The Pravda newspaper, an organ of the Czechoslovak Communist Party, used the riots to attack the democratic Third Czechoslovak Republic of being ineffectual unable to govern. In contrast, Čas, affiliated with the Democratic Party, focused on the moral bankruptcy of antisemitism as part of a broader postwar moral crisis and called upon Slovak Jews to patiently await the restoration of property by the courts. Pravda published an interview with Karol Šmidke, the leader of the Communists in the Slovak National Council, who emphasized the "fascist elements" who were supposedly plotting the destruction of the new order and called on them to be punished harshly in order to root them out.

Šmidke's statements represented the official position of the Czechoslovak and Slovak governments, which concluded that the rioting was not spontaneous, but organized by a fascist conspiracy. The authorities recommended that the government be purged of alleged reactionary elements. The Slovak police, which stated that the rioting was caused by Catholic elements and the Slovak State's antisemitic propaganda, recommended dismissing the mother superior and the Catholic principal of the school. It also highlighted aryanizers as the "spiritual instigators" of the violence. The main concern of the authorities was not the welfare of Jewish citizens, but the failure of the state to maintain order. Overall, the response was sluggish and many administrators used the incident as an excuse to accuse others of unrelated misbehavior. According to Robert Büchler, the authorities only responded to the rioting because the international coverage embarrassed the postwar government.

There are very few people in Topoľčany who would not approve of the events of 24 September 1945. Today in a conversation with a worker, a farmer, or a member of the intelligentsia you will find that people hate Jews outright.

— Slovak police report on the rioting

In the immediate aftermath of the events, few reports blamed Jews for the violence. Accusations that the Jews had provoked the riots due to their "provocative behavior" and refusal to integrate with Slovak society were added to later reports. The farther away the reports were produced and the later, the more virulent the blaming of Jews became; a 15 October report by the police commissioner in Bratislava claimed that "the main blame for the demonstrations rests on the provocative behavior of citizens of the Israelite religion against Christian citizens". Contrary to the wishes of the rioters, very few Jews left in the immediate aftermath of the 1945 pogrom; most remained behind to rebuild their lives and fight for the restitution of property. By 1948, there were still 344 Jews living in Topoľčany, but many emigrated in 1949 to the newly formed state of Israel, the United States, Australia, Mexico, and other countries. As of 2015, there are no longer any Jews living in the town.

== Modern interpretations ==
Writing about postwar anti-Jewish violence in Poland, Jan T. Gross argued that "Jews were perceived as a threat to the material status quo, security, and peaceful conscience" of their non-Jewish neighbors. Cichopek notes that it is impossible to prove what non-Jewish Poles and Slovaks were thinking after the war. Both Gross and Kamenec, in his analysis of the Topoľčany pogrom, focus more on material aspects while previous writers had emphasized the influence of antisemitic stereotypes. Kamenec argued that the consequences of Aryanization caused the resurgence of antisemitism. According to Kamenec, Šišjaková, and Cichopek, the lack of comprehensive legislation and competent administration of property transfer back to Jewish owners also contributed to uncertainty and anti-Jewish sentiment. However, Cichopek also emphasizes the role of antisemitic myths, such as blood libel, in fueling violence; she points out that without the vaccination hysteria, the rioting in Topoľčany would not have occurred or could have happened in a different way.

Cichopek argues that the Tiso regime, by its collaborationism with the Nazis and sending Jewish citizens to death camps, discredited antisemitism in postwar Slovakia. She also points out that the fascist regime also prevented the violence and chaos which had reigned for years in Poland under Nazi occupation, and that there were no extermination camps on Slovak soil. In Slovakia, the Judeo-Bolshevist canard was not prominent; instead Jews were accused of supporting Hungarian irredentism. According to Cichopek, these factors partially explain why the postwar anti-Jewish violence in Slovakia was less than that in Poland. Milan Stanislav Ďurica, a nationalist and Catholic theologian, blamed the victims in his analysis of the events. According to Büchler, the pogrom illuminates the "miserable situation" for Jews in Slovakia after liberation, as well as the indifference of the authorities to "the existential problems of the Jewish survivors".

== Legacy ==
A 2004 Slovak documentary film by Dušan Hudec, Miluj blížneho svojho ("Love thy neighbor") commemorates the riots. During the filming, a resident of Topoľčany stated that "Jews and Gypsies are the worst scum under the sun". The statement was censored from the final documentary against the wishes of the filmmaker and the Slovak Jewish community. The documentary was praised by Kamenec for bringing the incident to the attention of a broader audience. The Slovak writer Peter Bielik criticized the film, citing contemporary reports claiming that "the Jews behaved very arrogantly and imperiously, trying to systematically occupy important positions in the economic, public, and political spheres". Because of the controversy over these remarks, he withdrew from consideration for director of the National Memory Institute.

In 1998, at the initiative of Walter Fried, who survived the riots at the age of 17, a plaque was erected at the former synagogue, dedicated to "the eternal remembrance of our Jewish fellow citizens, inhabitants of Topoľčany, victims of racial and religious hatred, who were exiled and murdered between 1942 and 1945". (Note: Na večnú pamiatku našim židovským spoluobčanom, obyvateľom mesta Topoľčany, obetiam rasovej a náboženskej nenávisti, vyvlečeným a vyvraždeným v rokoch 1942 – 1945) In 2005, Mayor Pavol Seges formally apologized to the Jewish community, reading a letter at a ceremony in front of the descendants of survivors:

We are aware that all in Topoľčany are guilty. Please, the representatives of the town and citizens of the town beg your forgiveness.

== See also ==
- Partisan Congress riots
