= Vardan Ayvazyan =

Armenian politician

former Minister of Environmental Protection

Chair of the Standing Committee on Economic Affairs of the National Assembly

Personal details
- Born: 7 November 1961 (age 64) Tabatzghour, Georgian SSR, Soviet Union

Vardan Ayvazyan (Armenian: Վարդան Այվազյան; born 7 November 1961) is an Armenian government official, formerly Minister of Environmental Protection between 2001 and 2007.

== Career ==
Ayvazyan was born on 7 November 1961 in the Tabatzghour village, a majority Armenian town in the Borjomi Municipality of the Georgian SSR. In 1983 he graduated from the Yerevan Zooveterinary Institute, and afterwards, he worked as an operator at a dairy plant in Yaroslavl before completing his mandated service in the Soviet Army.

He held his first political position from 1995 to 1996, after the collapse of the USSR, becoming Chairman of the Executive Committee of the Charentsavan City Council for a year. Simultaneously, he became a member of the Parliament of Armenia as a Republican Party MP, a position he held until 2001. He was then the Mayor of Charentsavan until 1999.

From 2001 to 2007 Ayvazyan served as Minister of Environmental Protection. Later, he again became a member of the Parliament of Armenia as a Republican Party MP. In 2016, he was serving as Chairman of the Standing Committee on Economic issues.

== Corruption case ==
In 2024, the Armenian Anti-Corruption Court accepted a lawsuit from the Prosecutor General regarding Ayvazyan, who was accused of obtaining assets through illegal sources. The Prosecutor General's Office announced they would be pursuing the confiscation of 20 billion darmas (51.6 billion USD) through loan rights, shares and securities, multiple real estate properties, and vehicles.

Previously, in 2008, he was named as a defendant by the International Court of Arbitration regarding mining license allocations to associates. The 2008 case was filed by Global Gold Mining, and focused on the Hanqavan mine, and afterwards GGM also brought the case to the United States District Court for the Southern District of New York to enforce arbitration awards. The Southern District Case was appealed by Ayvazyan to the United States Court of Appeals for the Second Circuit, which issued a non-precedential summary order in 2015.
