= Anti-Jewish violence in Central and Eastern Europe, 1944–1946 =

The anti-Jewish violence in Central and Eastern Europe following the retreat of Nazi German occupational forces and the arrival of the Soviet Red Army – during the latter stages of World War II – was linked in part to postwar anarchy and economic chaos exacerbated by the Stalinist policies imposed across the territories of expanded Soviet republics and new satellite countries. The antisemitic attacks had become frequent in Soviet towns ravaged by war; at the marketplaces, in depleted stores, in schools, and even at state enterprises. Protest letters were sent to Moscow from numerous Russian, Ukrainian and Belarusian towns by the Jewish Anti-Fascist Committee involved in documenting the Holocaust.

== History ==
The Soviet authorities failed to address the years of Hitler's anti-Jewish propaganda, wrote Colonel David Dragunsky; antisemitic elements from among the former Nazi collaborators in the Soviet Union were often put in charge of state enterprises. Solomon Mikhailovich Mikhoels, Chairman of the JAFC, who was murdered in Minsk in January 1948, wrote that Jewish homes were not being returned. In Berdichev, Mogilev-Podolsk, Balta, Zhmerinka, Vinnitsa, Khmelnik, Stara Rafalovka and many other towns, Jews were forced to remain in the areas of former Nazi ghettos for their own safety. The Jewish Anti-Fascist Committee (JAFC) was targeted by Soviet authorities directly in the so-called rootless cosmopolitan campaign of the second half of the 1940s and in the Night of the Murdered Poets.

The JAFC Presidium met in late August, 1944, with a commander of a Jewish partisan unit from Belorussia. Answering a question concerning attitudes of the non-Jewish population towards Jews in Minsk, he stated: "... the attitude wasn't good. There have been numerous anti-semitic incidents ... a battle for apartments has started ... there are difficulties concerning employment.

Several months after the Mikhoels assassination, other Jewish figures were arrested. His death signalled the beginning of the country-wide repression of the Jews accused of espionage and economic crimes. A campaign against Zionism was launched in the fall of 1948, but by the end of the decade, Jews had disappeared from the upper echelons of the party in the republics. This was followed by the Doctor's plot of 1951–1953 accompanied by publications of anti-Semitic texts in the media, and hundreds of torture interrogations. Most communities in the Soviet Union never acknowledged the involvement of the local auxiliary police in the Holocaust. The vast majority of the 300,000 Schutzmannschaft members in the German-occupied territories of the USSR quietly returned to their former lives, including members of the Byelorussian Home Defence participating in the pacification actions, in which some 30,000 Jews were murdered, and members of Ukrainische Hilfspolizei battalions responsible for the extermination of 150,000 Jews in the area of Volhynia alone. Khrushchev proclaimed that the Jews were not welcome in Ukraine.

== Satellite countries ==
Upon the Soviet takeover of Poland, "only a fraction of [the Jewish] deaths could be attributed to anti-Semitism," wrote Jan T. Gross. Most were caused by the raging anti-communist insurrection against the new pro-Soviet government. According to David Engel, the anti-Jewish violence in Poland from 1944–1946 took the lives of at least 327 Jews.

Hundreds of returning Jews were killed in Romania. Anti-Jewish demonstrations, sometimes based on blood libel accusations, took place in Hungary in dozens of places, including in Kunmadaras (two or four dead victims) and Miskolc.

In Topoľčany, Slovakia, 48 Jews were seriously injured in September 1945. A number of Jews was murdered in Kolbasov in December. 13 anti-Jewish incidents called partisan pogroms reportedly took place on 1–5 August 1946, the biggest one being in Žilina, where 15 people were wounded. Partisan Congress riots took place in Bratislava in August 1946 and in August 1948, including anti-Jewish riots in several other locations.

In Kiev, Ukraine on September 4–7, 1945, around a hundred Jews were beaten, of whom thirty-six were hospitalized and five died of wounds. In Rubtsovsk, Russia, a number of antisemitic incidents took place in 1945.

== See also ==
- 1968 Polish political crisis
- Doctors' plot
- Prague Trials
- Night of the Murdered Poets
