= Secondary antisemitism =

Antisemitism explained as aftermath of the Holocaust

Secondary antisemitism is a distinct form of antisemitism which is said to have appeared after the end of World War II.

== Definitions ==
Secondary antisemitism is often explained as being caused by the Holocaust, as opposed to existing in spite of it. One frequently quoted formulation of the concept, first published in Henryk M. Broder's 1986 book Der Ewige Antisemit (The Eternal Antisemite), (Note: The title is a reference to the propaganda film Der ewige Jude) stems from the Israeli psychiatrist Zvi Rex, who once remarked: "The Germans will never forgive the Jews for Auschwitz." The term was coined by Peter Schönbach, a Frankfurt School co-worker of Theodor W. Adorno and Max Horkheimer, based on their critical theory.

Adorno, in a 1959 lecture titled "Was bedeutet: Aufarbeitung der Vergangenheit", published in his 1963 book Eingriffe. Neun kritische Modelle, addressed the fallacy of the broad German post-war tendency to associate and simultaneously causally link Jews with the Holocaust. According to Adorno's critique, an opinion had been readily accepted in Germany according to which the Jewish people were culpable in the crimes against them. Jewish guilt was assumed to varying extents, depending on the varying incarnations of that antisemitic notion, one of which is the idea that Jews were (and are) exploiting German guilt over the Holocaust. Adorno further wrote:

Sometimes the victors are declared to be the cause of what the defeated have done when they were still in charge, and for the crimes of Hitler those are declared guilty who acquiesced his rise to power, and not those who hailed him. The idiocy in all this is in fact an indication of something mentally uncoped-with, of a wound, although the thought of wounds should be dedicated to the victims.

Initially, members of the Frankfurt School spoke of "guilt-defensiveness anti-Semitism", an antisemitism motivated by a deflection of guilt. The rehabilitation of many lower and even several higher-ranking Third Reich officials and officers appears to have contributed to the development of secondary antisemitism. These officials were rehabilitated in spite of their considerable individual contributions to Nazi Germany's crimes. Several controversies ensued early in post-World War II Germany, e.g. when Konrad Adenauer appointed Hans Globke as Chief of the Chancellery, although the latter had formulated the Enabling Act of 1933, the emergency legislation that gave Hitler unlimited dictatorial powers and had been one of the leading legal commentators on the Nuremberg race laws of 1935. According to Adorno, parts of the German public never acknowledged these events and instead formed the notion of Jewish guilt in the Holocaust.

An alternative explanation was proposed for the spate of postwar antisemitic violence in Eastern Europe. In 1946, the Slovak writer Karel František Koch argued that the antisemitic incidents that he witnessed in Bratislava after the war were "not antisemitism, but something far worse—the robber's anxiety that he might have to return Jewish property," a view that has been endorsed by Czech-Slovak scholar Robert Pynsent. It has been estimated that only 15% of Jewish property was returned after the war, and restitution was "negligible" in Eastern Europe. Property not returned has been valued at over $100 million in 2005 dollars.

== See also ==
- Anti-Jewish violence in Central and Eastern Europe, 1944–1946
  - Anti-Jewish violence in Poland, 1944–1946
  - Kielce pogrom
- Genocide justification
- Daniel Goldhagen
- Holocaust denial
- Criticism of Holocaust denial
- Legality of Holocaust denial
  - Amendment to the Act on the Institute of National Remembrance
- Holocaust trivialization
- German collective guilt
- New antisemitism
- Victim blaming
  - Victim theory
- The Holocaust Industry
- 3D Test of Antisemitism

== Bibliography ==
- Broder, Henryk M. (1986). Der Ewige Antisemit (in German). Frankfurt am Main: S. Fischer Verlag. ISBN 978-3-596-23806-4.
- Pendas, Devin Owen (2005). The Frankfurt Auschwitz Trial, 1963-1965: Genocide, History and the Limits of the Law. Cambridge University Press. ISBN 978-0-521-84406-2.
- Pynsent, Robert B. [in Czech] (18 July 2013). "Conclusory Essay: Activists, Jews, The Little Czech Man, and Germans" (PDF). Central Europe. 5 (2): 211–333. doi:10.1179/174582107x190906. S2CID 144749278.
- Schönbach, Peter (1961). Reaktionen auf die antisemitische Welle im Winter 1959/60 (in German). Frankfurt am Main: Europäische Verlagsanstalt. ASIN B0000BNH43.
- Wistrich, Robert Solomon (2001). Who's Who in Nazi Germany. Routledge. ISBN 978-0-415-26038-1.
