= Martin Lacko =

Slovak historian

Martin Lacko (born 1976) is a Slovak historian. He specialises in modern Slovak history, particularly the period of the Slovak state from 1939 to 1945. Originally a mainstream historian with internationally acclaimed and cited works, Lacko has been considered controversial since 2014 due to his historical revisionist positions and his open support for the far-right ĽSNS party.

== Life ==
Lacko was born in 1976 in Piešťany. He studied history and philosophy at the Comenius University. He completed his doctorate at the Historical Institute of the Slovak Academy of Sciences in Bratislava. Lacko worked as a member of the scientific research section of the National Memory Institute in Bratislava. He specializes in Slovak history during the Second World War and has published over 30 academic studies on this topic in Slovakia and abroad.

In 2002–2004, he organised the conference "Slovenská republika 1939–1945 očami mladých historikov" ('Slovak Republic 1939–1945 in the eyes of young historians') three times. Lacko was regarded (see section Controversies) as one of the most renowned Slovak historians of the so-called 'young generation of historians', who in their assessment of Slovak history, especially the Slovak state, see themselves as a middle way between the 'glorifying works' of exiled Slovak historians such as Milan Stanislav Ďurica and František Vnuk and the ‘strongly negative works’ of Slovak historians still active under the communist regime such as Ivan Kamenec and Dušan Kováč.

== Reception ==
Lacko was originally regarded as a renowned historian in Slovakia. Lacko's work also attracted international attention. For example, the German historian Tatjana Tönsmeyer (2011) wrote in her review of Lacko's 2008 monograph on the Slovak National Uprising:

However, the internal Slovak disputes about the significance and the ability of the state of the war years to maintain its traditions for the Slovak self-image continue and have come to a head in the debate about the ‘national’ uprising. A further contribution to this debate is to be presented here by a younger Slovak historian, who has already made a name for himself with several works, especially on the military history of the Slovak state, as well as with several highly regarded editions of sources, including situation reports from the security services from January to August 1944. Martin Lacko has recently published an easy-to-read book for a wider audience, which is attractively designed with selected illustrations. In contrast to earlier accounts, it is also positive that aspects that have been less focussed on to date are also taken into account. Not only are the various groups involved in the resistance presented in detail, but everyday life in the area of the uprising is also discussed and it is impressively shown that at the end of 1944 and beginning of 1945, Slovakia was also included in the history of violence that is known from many regions, especially in Eastern Europe under German occupation.

The picture of the uprising painted by Lacko is much more multifaceted than earlier accounts, but Tönsmeyer is critical of the fact that Lacko does not take into account the results of international research and, in Tönsmeyer's opinion, pursues a 'historical-political intention'. Lacko constructs an image of history for Slovak society for which he claims 'truth', offers military 'heroes' in particular and hopes that his readership will take a positive view of Slovak statehood. The German historian Martin Zückert also comments on Lacko's monograph on the Slovak National Uprising. In his essay (2011) on the Slovak resistance against the Tiso regime, Zückert categorises Lacko's work among those accounts that 'critically assess the role of the partisans and the Soviet Union' and have recently caused controversy in Slovakia. The Czech historian Lenka Šindelářová (2013), on the other hand, writes about Lacko's account of the history of Slovakia from 1939 to 1945, also published in 2008, that Lacko's work and that of Ivan Kamenec and Ján Korček in particular proved to be helpful for an overall picture of developments in the Slovak state.

In 2014, a controversy broke out in Slovakia over Lacko. The ultra-nationalist Slovak website 29august1944.sk, which criticised the Slovak National Uprising against the National Socialists and the Slovak collaborationist regime as an 'anti-national betrayal', named Martin Lacko as one of the historians supporting it. Since then, he has been cited in Slovak media as a 'controversial historian'.

At the end of October 2015, Lacko signed a declaration supporting Marian Kotleba's far-right party against the backdrop of the ongoing election campaign for the 2016 parliamentary elections. In early September 2016, Lacko was dismissed as an employee of the ‘Institute of the Memory of the Nation’ (Slovak: Ústav pamäti národa, ÚPN), which investigates the crimes of both the National Socialists and the Communists in Slovakia. In 2017, it became known that Lacko was now officially working as an assistant to MP Natália Grausová from the Kotleba party.

== Selected works ==
Document collections

- Zrod Slovenského štátu v kronikách slovenskej armády [= The birth of the Slovak state in the chronicles of the Slovak army]. Ústav pamäti národa: Bratislava, ISBN 978-80-89335-19-0. (2010)
- Dotyky s boľševizmom. Dokumenty spravodajstva slovenskej armády 1940–1941 [= Contact with Bolshevism. Documents of the Intelligence Service of the Slovak Army 1940-1941]. Ústav pamäti národa: Bratislava, ISBN 978-80-89335-11-4. (2009)
- Proti Poľsku. Odraz ťaženia roku 1939 v denníkoch a kronikáck slovenskej armády [= Against Poland. Effects of the campaign in 1939 in the diaries and chronicles of the Slovak army]. Ústav pamäti národa: Bratislava, ISBN 978-80-89335-00-8. (2007)

Monographs

- Slovenskí generáli 1939–1945 [= Slovak Generals 1939–1945]. Ottovo nakladatelství: Prag, ISBN 978-80-7451-246-9. (2013, together with Peter Jašek und Branislav Kinčok)
- Dwuramienny krzyż w cieniu swastyki. Republika Słowacka 1939–1945 [= The double cross in the shadow of the swastika. The Slovak Republic 1939-1945]. EL-Press: Lublin, ISBN 83-86869-32-1. (2012, Polish)
- Slovenské národné povstanie 1944 [The Slovak National Uprising 1944]. Slovart: Bratislava, ISBN 978-80-8085-575-8. (2008)
- Slovenská republika 1939–1945 [The Slovak Republic 1939–1945]. Perfekt: Bratislava, ISBN 978-80-8046-408-0. (2008)
- Dezercie a zajatia príslušníkov zaisťovacej divízie v ZSSR v rokoch 1942–1943 [Desertions and captures of members of the Security Division in the USSR in the years 1942-1943]. Ústav pamäti národa: Bratislava, ISBN 978-80-969699-4-4. (2007)
