= National Memory Institute (Slovakia) =

- Ústav pamäti národa
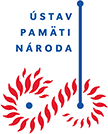
- Logo of the National Memory Institute

Agency overview
- Formed: 2003; 23 years ago
- Jurisdiction: Government of Slovakia
- Headquarters: Bratislava, Slovakia
- Website: www.upn.gov.sk

The National Memory Institute (Slovak: Ústav pamäti národa) is a Slovak public institution that holds the police records of the fascist Slovak Republic and communist Czechoslovak Socialist Republic regimes that ruled Slovakia during the 20th century. The institute also promotes research into these periods of Slovak history and educates the general public of this history. It publishes a journal, Pamäť národa, which is currently edited by Róbert Letz. The founder of the institute was Ján Langoš, who served as director until his death in a suspicious car crash in 2006.

== History ==
The NMI is authorized by act of the National Council of Slovakia No. 553/2002: "Coll. on Disclosure of Documents Regarding the Activity of State Security Authorities from 1939 to 1989 and on founding the Nation's Memory Institute and on Amending Certain Acts".

The Institute's headquarters has moved frequently, its seventh and current location is 19 Miletičova Street in Bratislava. In December 2021 the Institute announced that construction would begin on a new and more permanent location for the institution on Krížna Street in Bratislava. The new facility, scheduled to be open by 2026, will include a library and an exhibition open to the public.

== Controversy ==
One of the institution's staff historians, Martin Lacko, was fired in 2016 for promoting the Nazi-era First Slovak Republic.

== Academic opinion ==
James Mace Ward commented that the NMI "has done a brisk trade in publications on the Slovak Republic, much of this scholarship being of high quality. Yet the focus on the state seems disproportionate, as the institute’s archive has few relevant holdings".

Political scientist Jelena Subotić states that after Langoš's death, "The Institute’s main goal became the delegitimization of Slovakia’s communist regime, achieved by grouping it together with fascism while making a case that communist dictatorship was, in fact, worse."

== See also ==
- Institute for the Study of Totalitarian Regimes (Czechia)
- Polish Institute of National Remembrance
- Ukrainian Institute of National Memory
