= Postwar anti-Jewish violence in Slovakia =

Anti-Jewish rioting and violence in Slovakia

Postwar anti-Jewish violence in Slovakia resulted in at least 36 deaths of Jews and more than 100 injuries between 1945 and 1948, according to research by the Polish historian Anna Cichopek. Overall, it was significantly less severe than in Poland. The causes of the violence included antisemitism and conflict over the restitution of property stolen from Jews during the Holocaust in Slovakia.

The violence often took the form of rioting, and occurred in waves: late 1945, mid-1946, early 1947, and mid-1948. The most notable incidents were the Topoľčany pogrom on 24 September 1945, the Kolbasov massacre in December 1945, and the Partisan Congress riots in Bratislava in early August 1946. The violence ceased after the emigration of most Jews by the end of 1949.

== Background ==
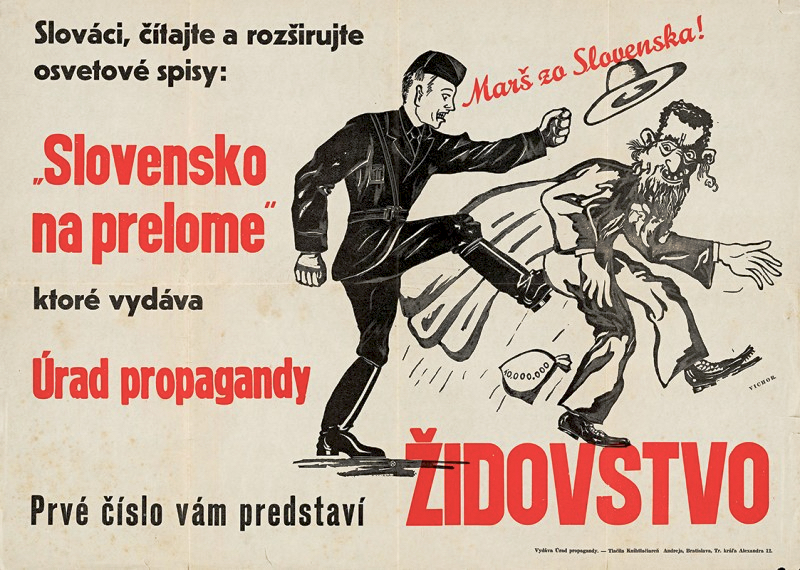
Slovak State propaganda ordering Jews to "Get out of Slovakia!"

The Slovak State, a one-party state of the Hlinka's Slovak People's Party (HSĽS), declared its independence from Czechoslovakia on 14 March 1939. Although the Slovak State was an Axis client state during World War II, it enjoyed considerable latitude in domestic policy, including anti-Jewish actions. Anti-Jewish laws were passed in 1940 and 1941, depriving Jews of their property via Aryanization and redistributing it to Slovaks viewed by the regime as more deserving. Unusually, the Slovak State organized the deportation of 58,000 of its own Jewish citizens to German-occupied Poland in 1942, which was carried out by the paramilitary Hlinka Guard and regular policemen. On 29 August 1944, Germany invaded Slovakia, sparking the Slovak National Uprising. The fighting and German countermeasures devastated much of the country; nearly 100 villages were burned by Einsatzgruppe H. Thousands of people, including several hundred Jews, were murdered in Slovakia, and more than 10,000 Jews were deported. Anti-regime forces included Slovak Army defectors, Agrarians, Communists, and Jews. Altogether 69,000 of the 89,000 Jews in the Slovak State were murdered during the Holocaust. After the war, Slovakia was reincorporated into Czechoslovakia; it retained a government in Bratislava with significant autonomy. The organizations ÚSŽNO (for Jews) and SRP (Association of Racially Persecuted People) formed to advocate for the rights of Jewish survivors.

== Causes ==
Conflict over Aryanization and restitution characterized postwar relations between Jews and Slovaks. At issue was not just large businesses which had been Aryanized, but confiscated movable property (such as furniture) which had been sold to non-Jewish buyers. There were also conflicts regarding movable property that had been entrusted to non-Jews who refused to return it after the war. For many Slovaks, restitution meant returning property that they had paid for under the then-existing law, developed, and considered theirs. From the perspective of Jews, however, it was the obligation of those in possession of stolen property to return it. Former partisans, veterans of the Czechoslovak armies abroad, and political prisoners were prioritized for appointment as national administrators (Note: National administrators (Slovak: národné správcovia) were the state-appointed managers of nationalized property Aryanized by the Slovak State regime, left behind by deported Jews, or confiscated from "traitors and politically unreliable people" (Germans and Hungarians) by the postwar Czechoslovak government. The administrators were required to be "nationally and politically reliable, with appropriate professional and practical knowledge", and benefitted economically from their appointment.) of previously Jewish businesses or residences. In some cases, national administrators were appointed even though the owners or their heirs were still alive. The newly appointed national administrators considered their gains just reward for their sacrifices during the war—a rationale that was endorsed by the government.

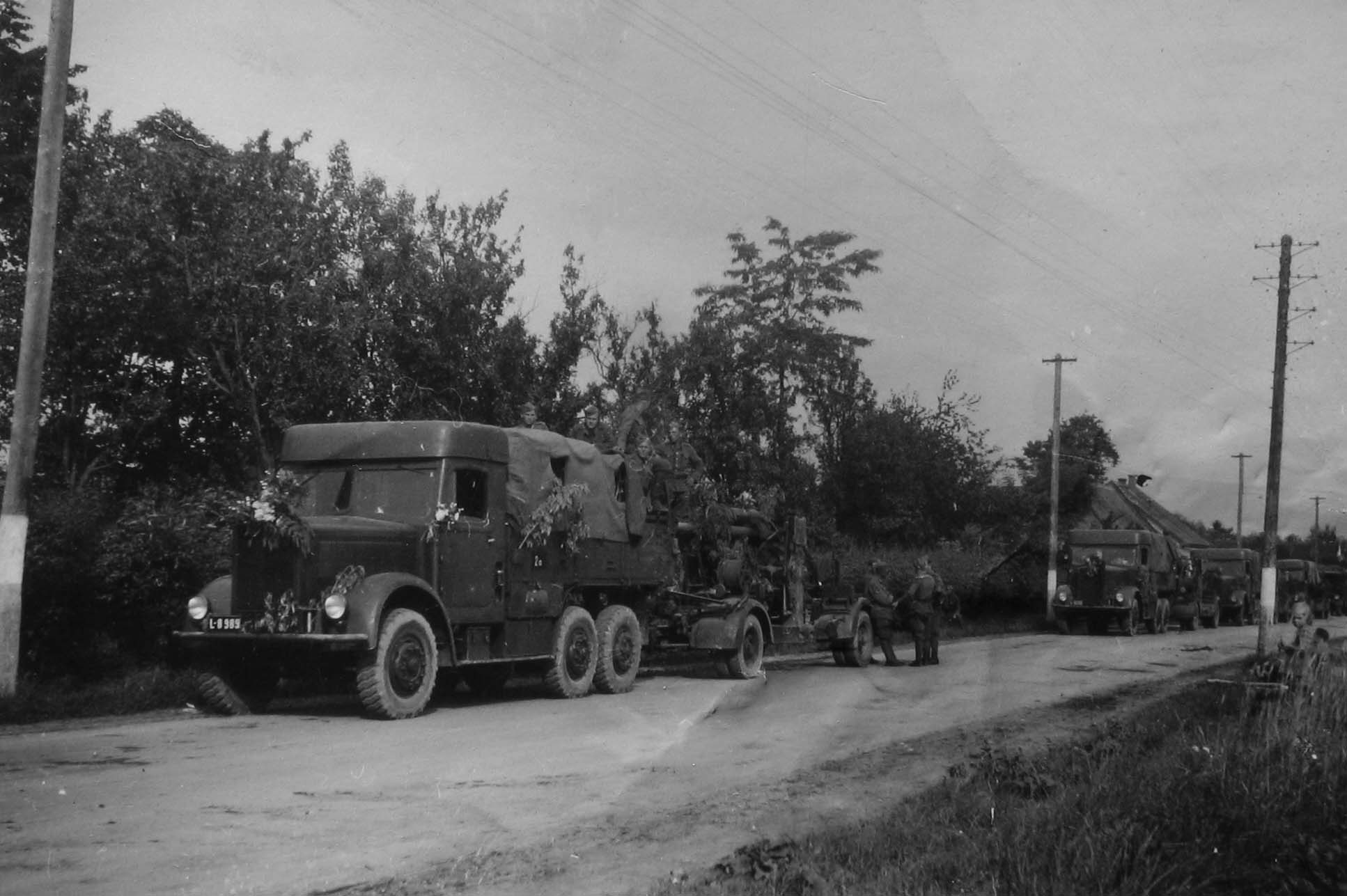
The Slovak National Uprising brought devastation to central and eastern Slovakia.

Before the war, economic antisemitism had portrayed Jews as economic exploiters of poor Slovaks who lived off their labor. After the war, Jews were accused of shirking manual labor and instead being involved in black market and smuggling. In defense of Jewish participation in the black market, SRP chairman Vojtech Winterstein said: "Jews have to make a living. They have no money, no opportunity to make money..." Jews were also criticized for accepting help from the American Jewish Joint Distribution Committee and other international organizations. Many non-Jewish Slovaks believed that Jews occupied a privileged position in the economy. Unlike in the Czech lands, most Slovaks saw a reduction in their standard of living after liberation. Over the winter of 1945–1946, UNRRA reported that hundreds of thousands of residents of rural areas in eastern Slovakia still lacked housing. The straitened economic circumstances meant that any sign of favoritism became a cause of ethnic resentment. False claims were made that Jews had not suffered as much as non-Jews during the war and had not participated in the Slovak National Uprising, which further fueled resentment against them.

Another source of antisemitism, and trigger for violence, was false rumors and antisemitic conspiracy theories, especially that Jewish doctors were conspiring to kill non-Jews with drugs or vaccines. For example, before the Topoľčany pogrom, a Jewish doctor carrying out vaccinations of schoolchildren was accused of poisoning them. In Michalovce, a Jewish salesman was accused of selling poisoned watermelon and candies. Jews were also rumored to have kidnapped or murdered non-Jewish children. Actual ritual murder libel was rare but occurred, especially in the form of Jews supposedly needing Christian blood in connection to emigration to Israel. Especially in eastern Slovakia, supporters of the former regime were outraged that the new government considered participation in roundups and deportation of Jews to be a criminal offense. It was alleged that Jews manipulated the court system in order to obtain a harsher verdict in cases where the defendant was accused of harming Jews. Jews were also criticized for speaking German or Hungarian. Unlike non-Jewish Germans and Hungarians, the majority of Jews in Slovakia who had German or Hungarian as their mother tongue were not expelled from the country and retained their Czechoslovak citizenship. Another issue was the passage of Jewish refugees from Poland and Hungary through Czechoslovakia; these Jews did not speak Czech or Slovak, further inflaming suspicions. The anti-Jewish policies of the wartime government sharpened categorization along ethnic lines; when victims were attacked because of being Jews, their Jewishness overpowered any other affiliations (such as political, national, or economic).

Czech historian Hana Kubátová points out that these accusations against Jews differed little from classical antisemitism as found in, for example, the eighteenth-century novel René by Jozef Ignác Bajza.

== 1945 ==
Locations where significant anti-Jewish violence was reported

The first postwar anti-Jewish riot occurred in Košice on 2 May. In late June, rumors circulated in Bardejov that Jews were stockpiling firearms and ammunition. Some partisans tried to search their houses, but were stopped by police. On 22 July, 1,000 people participated in a partisan demonstration at which a man, identified in a police report as Captain Palša, advocated the "cleansing" of collaborators from the area. Antisemitic slogans were shouted, and some demonstrators went to a nearby bakery where white bread (forbidden by rationing laws) was supposedly being made for Jews. They confiscated the bread to give it to infirm individuals. The next morning a drunk Palša was heard shouting "the Jew was and always will be our enemy". On 26 December 1945, two soldiers physically assaulted seven Jews in the town. In July, the rioting spread to the nearby city of Prešov, where non-Jews complained about the deportation of Czechoslovak citizens to the Soviet Union; Jews were accused of supporting Communism. Jewish community offices, a communal kitchen, and Jewish buildings were robbed and vandalized.

=== Topoľčany pogrom ===
In Nitra, local women were infuriated with inadequate food rations. On 11 September 1945, after a rumor spread alleging that nuns at the local school would be replaced by Jewish teachers, the situation escalated into a 200-strong demonstration against the local District National Committee. One woman complained, "the committee is already stuffed, while we are starving, we have no bread or wood and we have no food to cook for our children. But the Jews have enough of everything, even sugar and boots." (Note: "Výbor sa o nás nestará, aby sme mali čo jesť, však výbor je už napchatý, ale my hladujeme, nemáme chleba, dreva a nemáme deťom čo variť, aby sa najedli. Preto ale Židia majú všetkého dosť, títo majú dostať cukor aj baganče.")

Throughout September, anti-Jewish propaganda was distributed in Topoľčany and Jews were physically harassed. In early September, nuns who taught at a local Catholic school for girls heard that their institution was about to be nationalized, and that they would be replaced. Although many Slovak schools were nationalized in 1945, rumors that it was due to a Jewish conspiracy and that Jewish teachers would replace gentiles were unfounded. The mothers of children at the school petitioned the government not to nationalize it and accused Jews of trying to take over the school for the benefit of Jewish children. On Sunday, 23 September 1945, people threw stones at a young Jewish man at a train station and vandalized a house inhabited by Jews in nearby Žabokreky. The next day, gentile Slovaks gathered on the streets and chanted antisemitic slogans; a few Jews were assaulted and their homes burglarized. Policemen declined to intervene based on unfounded rumors that Jews had killed four children in Topoľčany. In Chynorany rumor held that thirty children had been murdered by Jews; at least one Jew was attacked and others were robbed.

There are very few people in Topoľčany who would not approve of the events of 24 September 1945. Today in a conversation with a worker, a farmer, or a member of the intelligentsia you will find that people hate Jews outright.

— Slovak police report

The antisemitic riot that occurred in Topoľčany on 24 September 1945 was the best-known incident of post-Holocaust violence against Jews in Slovakia. On the morning of the incident, women demonstrated against the nationalization of the school, blaming Jews. That same day, a Jewish doctor was vaccinating children at the school. He was accused of poisoning non-Jewish children, sparking a riot during which 200 or 300 people beat local Jews. The police were unable to prevent it, and a local garrison of soldiers joined in. Forty-seven Jews were injured, and fifteen had to be hospitalized. International media coverage embarrassed the Czechoslovak authorities and the Czechoslovak Communist Party exploited the riots to accuse the democratic authorities of ineffectiveness. The event in Topoľčany had a greater significance than to the people directly affected because it became synecdoche for postwar antisemitism in Slovakia.

=== Trebišov riot ===
On 14 November 1945, a riot occurred in the eastern Slovak town of Trebišov over the refusal of the authorities to distribute shoes to people who did not belong to a recognized trade union. About four hundred rioters went to a prison where Andrej Danko, who had led the district during the Slovak State, was held awaiting trial, shouting that Danko would have distributed the shoes fairly. A Jewish veterinarian named Hecht was attacked, either after being dragged out of his apartment or on the street. Hecht was blamed for Danko's arrest because he had informed the authorities of Danko's past as a Slovak State administrator, and was beaten until he promised to withdraw his accusations.

=== Kolbasov massacre ===
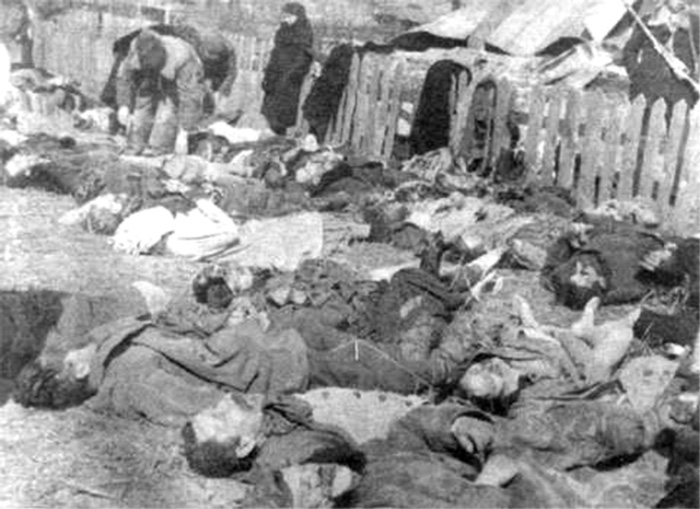
Polish victims of Ukrainian Insurgent Army massacre in Lipniki, Volhniya

The most deadly attacks against Slovak Jews occurred in Snina District, where eighteen Slovak Jews were murdered in November and December 1945. On 23 November 1945, a Jewish man named David Gelb was abducted in Nová Sedlica and disappeared. On 6 December 1945 around 20:00, armed men entered the house of Alexander Stein in Ulič, and murdered him along with his wife and another two Jewish women who were present. Later than night, they entered Mendel Polák's house in nearby Kolbasov, where twelve young Holocaust survivors were living. The invaders raped the women, forced the men to sing, stole some alcohol, jewelry, and money, and shot four men and seven women. Seventeen-year-old Auschwitz survivor Helena Jakubičová survived by hiding under a blanket next to the corpses of her two sisters. After the attackers left, she fled to another house in the same town where several Jews lived, but were apparently not known to the attackers. She testified that the attackers had identified themselves as followers of Stepan Bandera. When the SRP came to investigate, it found non-Jewish neighbors stealing belongings from Polák's house, including a cow and a sewing machine.

The murders attracted national attention and led to widespread criticism of local police for failing to prevent the killings. It was assumed that the murderers were members of the Ukrainian Insurgent Army (UPA) who had crossed over into Slovakia. The presence of the UPA in the area was documented; their modus operandi was to ask locals where Jews and Communists lived, then return at night to attack them. However, the culprits of the massacre were never identified, and it is possible that they belonged to an unrelated armed group. Slovak historian Michal Šmigeľ notes that the police and government tried to downplay local antisemitism and blame incidents on the UPA instead. He hypothesizes that local police, Communists, or people seeking to acquire Jewish property were responsible for some of the violence, and may have collaborated with the UPA. Slovak historian Jana Šišjaková theorizes that a Polish–Slovak criminal gang may have been responsible for the killings in Kolbasov.

== 1946 ==
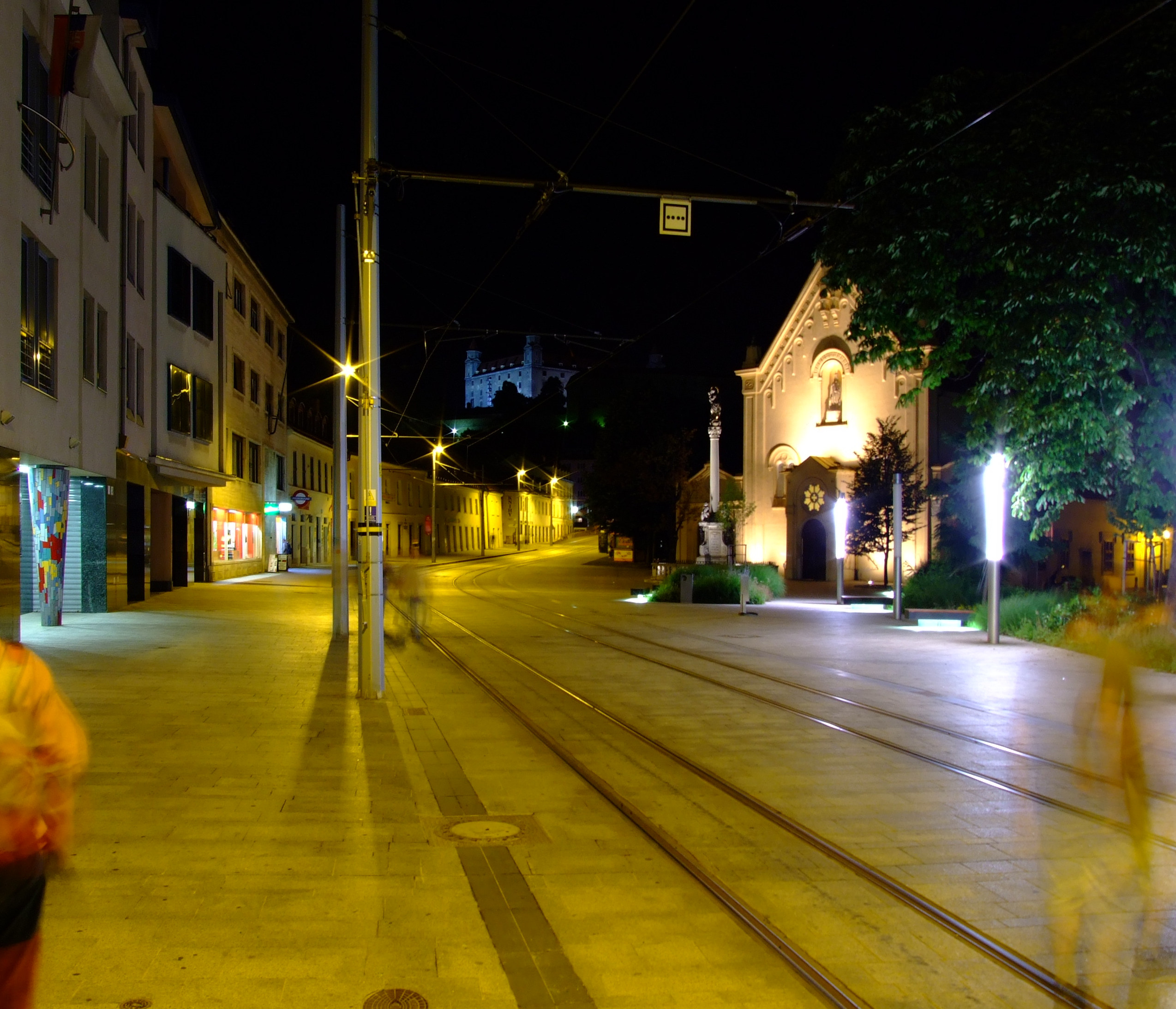
Kapucínska Street, Bratislava, where passersby were assaulted during the riots

Tensions between Jewish and non-Jewish Slovaks were exacerbated in May 1946 by the passage of the Restitution Act 128/1946, an unpopular law that mandated the restoration of Aryanized property and businesses to their original owners. Both antisemitic leaflets and attacks on Jews—many of them initiated by former partisans—increased following the restitution law. Multiple leaflets gave Jews an ultimatum to leave the country by the end of July 1946; Šmigeľ suggests that the similarities in the leaflets imply that there was a coordinated campaign. In late July and early August, leaflets appeared with the phrases "Beat the Jews!", "Now or never, away with the Jews!", and even "Death to the Jews!". (Note: "Bite Židov!" (29 July in Bratislava), "Teraz alebo nikdy preč so Židmi!" (1 August in Zlaté Moravce) and "Smrť Židom!" (1/2 August in Žilina).) During the last week of July, posters were put up around Bratislava with slogans such as "Attention Jew, a partisan is coming to beat Jews", "Czechoslovakia is for Slovaks and Czechs, Palestine is for Jews", "Jews to Palestine!" "Jews out!" and "Hang the Jews!" (Note: "Pozor žide, partisan ide židov biť" "ČSR pre Slovákov a Čechov, Palestína pre židákov" "Židia do Palestíny!" "Židia von!" "Židov obesiť!") In early July, two former partisans in Bytča repeatedly attacked Jews. In August, Ján Kováčik, the secretary of the local chapter of the Union of Slovak Partisans, formed a group of several partisans in order to attack the Jewish residents in the area. Kováčik's group was shut down a few months later by the authorities. From mid-July 1946, minor anti-Jewish incidents were occurring on an almost daily basis in Bratislava.

A national conference of former Slovak partisans was held in Bratislava on 2–4 August 1946. Rioting began on 1 August, and many of the rioters were identified as former partisans. Despite attempts by the Czechoslovak police to maintain order, ten apartments where were broken into, nineteen people were injured (four seriously), and the Jewish community kitchen was ransacked. In addition to the riots in Bratislava, other anti-Jewish incidents occurred the same month in several cities and towns in northern, eastern, and southern Slovakia. These included Nové Zámky (2 August and 4 August), Žilina (4–6 August), Komárno (4 August), Čadca (5 August), Dunajská Streda, Šahy (8–9 August), Liptovský Svätý Mikuláš, Beluša, Tornaľa (11 August), Šurany (17–18 August), and Veľká Bytča. The rioting in Žilina left another fifteen people injured; police detained only a few people as a result of the attacks in Bratislava and elsewhere. Slovak historian Ján Mlynárik suggests that the occurrence of similar events in multiple locations in Slovakia may indicate that they were planned in advance. Czechoslovak media either denied the riots occurred, or claimed that partisans had not been involved in violence against Jews. The government responded by announcing stricter security measures and simultaneously suspending restitution to Jews.

== 1947 ==
The trial of Jozef Tiso, the former president of the Slovak State, raised fears of anti-Jewish violence, which the Slovak nationalist underground unsuccessfully tried to incite. The police made up a list of politically unreliable individuals to be arrested if there was any violence, which the Communist Party planned to exploit to increase its power. At some of the pro-Tiso demonstrations there were antisemitic elements: in Piešťany, demonstrators shouted anti-Jewish and anti-Czech slogans; in Chynorany and Žabokreky, they sang Hlinka Guard songs and reportedly stopped vehicles asking if there were Czechs or Jews in the car. The only full-blown riot was in Bardejov in early June.

== 1948 ==
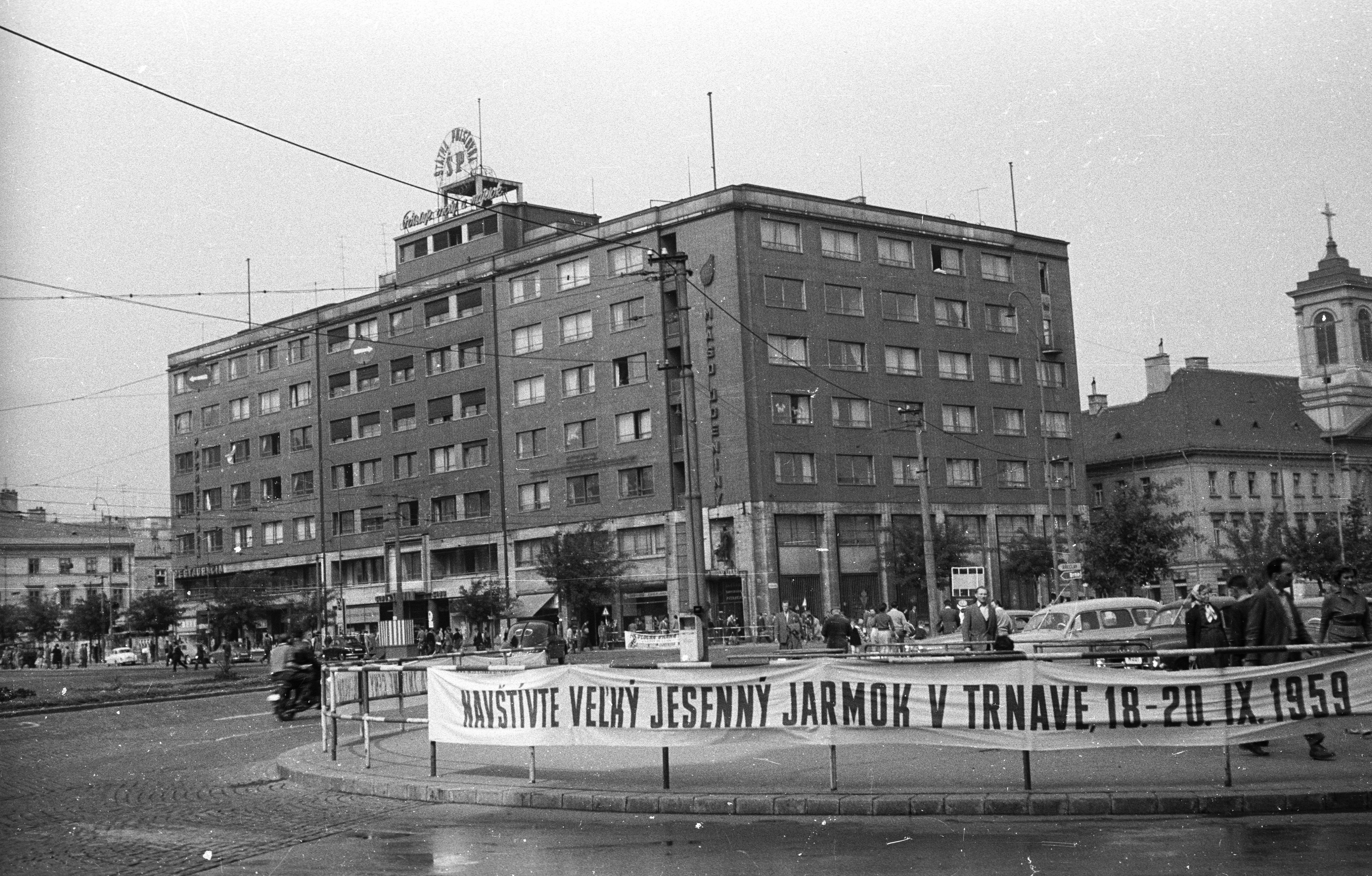
Stalin Square in 1959

Further anti-Jewish riots erupted in Bratislava on August 20 and 21, 1948. The unrest began with a dispute at a farmers' market in Stalin Square, where Emilia Prášilová, a pregnant non-Jewish Slovak woman, accused vendors of showing favoritism towards Jews. A Jewish woman, Alica Franková, referred to Prášilová as "an SS woman," leading to a confrontation between the two. After both women were arrested, passersby beat up another two Jewish women, one of whom was hospitalized. Yelling "Hang the Jews!" and "Jews out!" they sacked the same Jewish kitchen that had been attacked two years previously. Another attempted demonstration the next day was dispersed by police, and 130 rioters were arrested, of whom forty were convicted. By the summer of 1948, however, antisemitic incidents were decreasing in Slovakia.

== Reactions ==
In mid-1945, World Jewish Congress representative Maurice Perlzweig urged Czechoslovak authorities to act to stop the violence: "It is really a terrible blow to us to have to face the fact that Jews are subjected to physical violence in any part of Czechoslovakia. We might regard it as normal elsewhere, but not there." Stories of anti-Jewish incidents in Slovakia were quickly picked up by the Hungarian press, which passed them to the Jewish media to discredit Czechoslovakia. The Slovak government in turn blamed the incidents on Hungarians in Slovakia. Despite this, most of the incidents were by ethnic Slovaks, not Hungarians, although some anti-Jewish riots by Hungarians in southern Slovakia also occurred. Slovak authorities sometimes blamed the victims for the violence, such as claiming that Jews' "provocative behavior" caused the hostility against them. Both the Democratic Party and the Communist Party officially condemned antisemitism, blaming the other party for it.

== Aftermath ==
Violence against Jews was one of the factors driving emigration from Slovakia. Following the departure of most Slovak Jews to the State of Israel and other countries after the 1948 Communist coup—only a few thousand were left by the end of 1949—antisemitism transmuted into a political form as evinced in the Slánský trial. The 2004 film Miluj blížneho svojho ("Love thy neighbor") discussed the riots in Topoľčany and contemporary attitudes towards them, attracting considerable critical attention. The mayor of Topoľčany apologized for the rioting a year later.

== Comparison ==
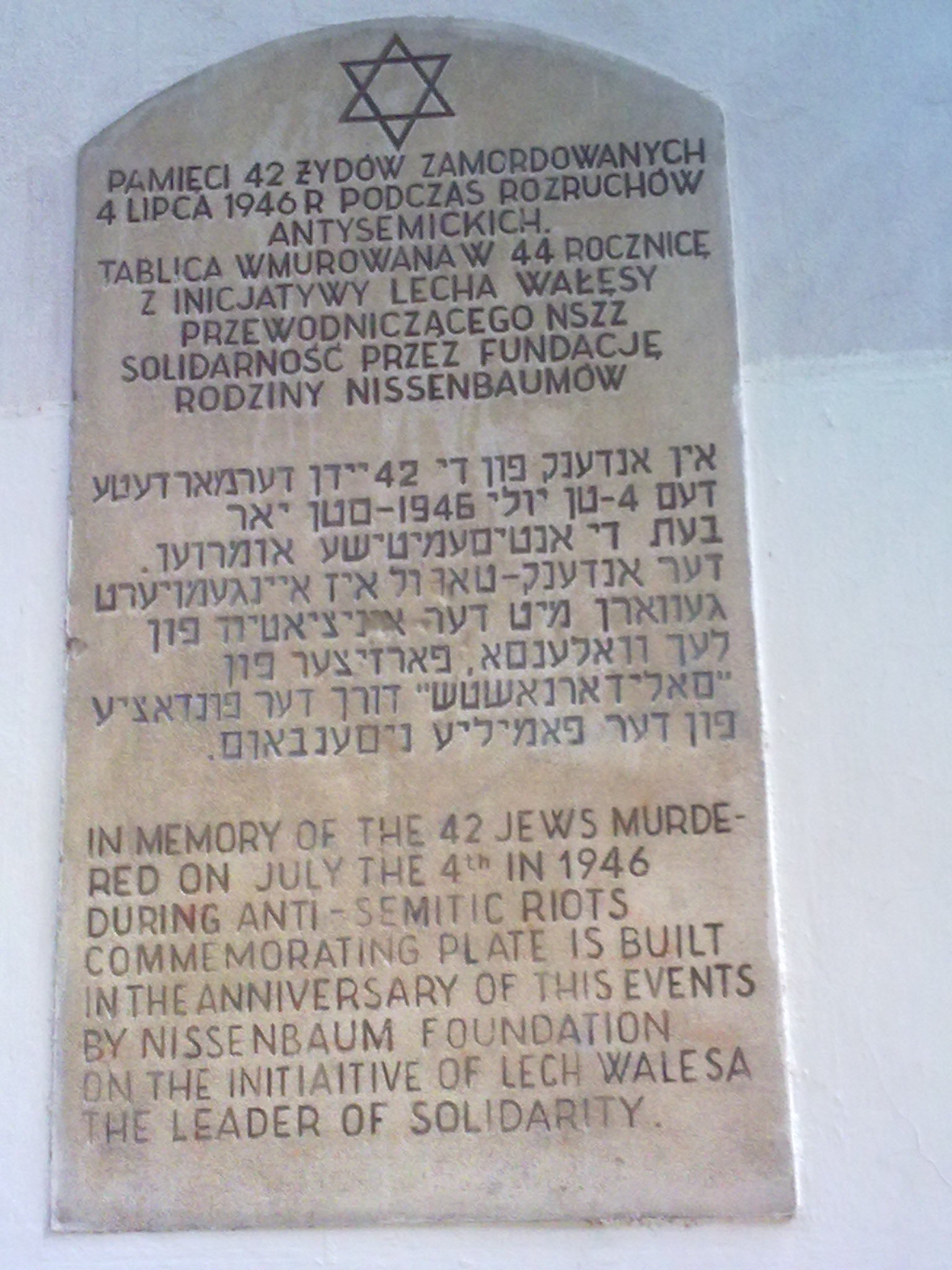
Memorial to the 42 Jews murdered during the Kielce pogrom

Postwar anti-Jewish violence also occurred in Poland (Kielce pogrom), Hungary (Kunmadaras pogrom), and other countries. The violence in Slovakia was less serious than that in Poland, where hundreds of Jews and perhaps more than a thousand were killed. Czech historian Jan Láníček states that the situation in Slovakia was not comparable to that in Poland and emphasizes that, "[w]ith minor exceptions in Slovakia", "Czechoslovakia was not a country of crude, violent, or physical antisemitism, of pogroms and violent riots." Some reasons that have been suggested for this difference is that the collaborationist Slovak State government discredited antisemitism, that it shielded most of the Slovak population from the ravages of war until 1944, and that the death camps were located in Poland, not Slovakia. Sources on the violence are fragmentary and incomplete, making it difficult to estimate how many Jews were killed or injured as a result. Polish historian Anna Cichopek speculates that at least 36 Jews were killed and 100 injured. Women were prominent agitators in many of the anti-Jewish demonstrations including Topoľčany in 1945, Piešťany in 1947, and Bratislava in 1948. American historian James Ramon Felak suggests that women did not fear police mistreatment especially if they went to demonstrations with their children, as well as women in rural areas tending to be devout Catholics and strong supporters of the Slovak People's Party.
