= Partisan Congress riots =

1946 anti-Jewish riots in Slovakia

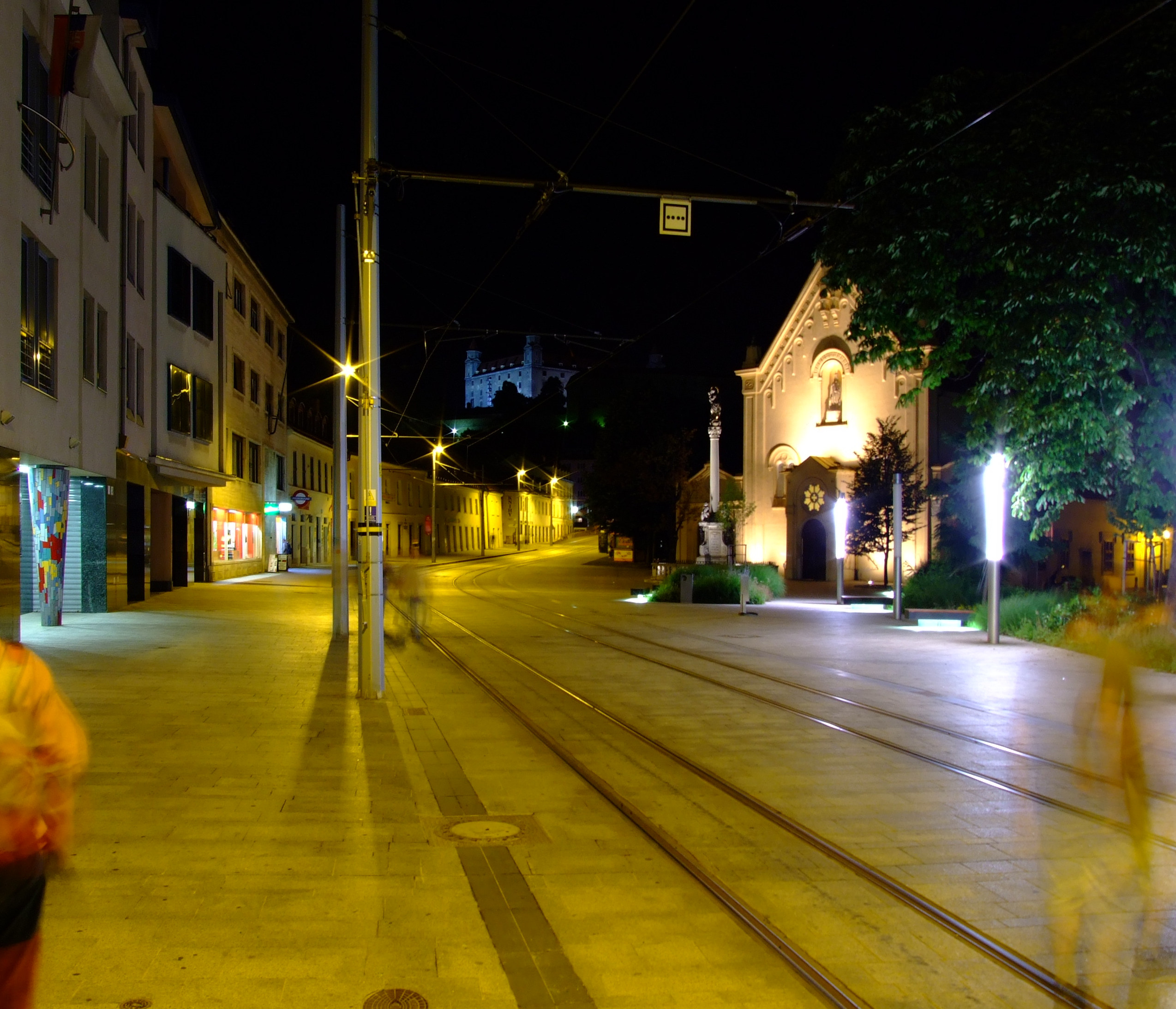
Kapucínska Street, where passersby were assaulted during the riots

The Partisan Congress riots were attacks on Jews in Bratislava and other cities and towns in the autonomous Slovak region of Czechoslovakia between 1 and 6 August 1946. Nineteen people were injured, four seriously, in Bratislava alone.

After World War II in Europe ended in May 1945, former Slovak partisans were often appointed as national administrators (Note: National administrators (Slovak: národní správcovia) were the state-appointed managers of nationalized property Aryanized by the Slovak State regime, left behind by deported Jews, or confiscated from "traitors and politically unreliable people" (Germans and Hungarians) by the postwar Czechoslovak government. The administrators were required to be "nationally and politically reliable, with appropriate professional and practical knowledge", and benefitted economically from their appointment.) of businesses that had been Aryanized, or confiscated, from Jews by the Axis client state known as the Slovak State, leading to conflict with Jews seeking to regain their property. This conflict sporadically erupted into attacks on Jews. Tensions between Jewish and non-Jewish Slovaks were exacerbated in May 1946 by the passage of an unpopular law that mandated the restitution of Aryanized property and businesses to their original owners. Both antisemitic leaflets and attacks on Jews—many of them initiated by former partisans—increased following the restitution law.

Rioting began on 1 August with the robbery of František Hoffmann's apartment. A national congress of former Slovak partisans was held in Bratislava on 2–4 August 1946, and many of the rioters were identified as former partisans. Rioting continued until 6 August. Despite attempts by the Czechoslovak police to maintain order, ten apartments were broken into, nineteen people were injured (four seriously), and the Jewish community kitchen was ransacked. Additional attacks and riots were reported in other Slovak towns and cities, including Nové Zámky and Žilina. The contemporary press played down the involvement of partisans and instead claimed that the riots were organized by "reactionary elements", Hungarians, or former Hlinka Guardsmen. In response, the government launched a crackdown on antisemitic incitement and simultaneously suspended restitution to Jews.

== Background ==
Jews have lived in Bratislava (then known by its German name, Pressburg) since the medieval era. Although they were expelled in 1526, Jews began to settle in the suburb of Podhradie towards the end of the seventeenth century. In the eighteenth century, Pressburg was the most influential Jewish community in the Kingdom of Hungary, with more than a thousand members. In the nineteenth century, traditional religious antisemitism was joined by economic antisemitism, the stereotypical view of Jews as exploiters of poor Slovaks. National antisemitism strongly associated Jews with the Hungarian state and accused them of sympathizing with Hungarian national aims at the expense of Slovak ambitions. Between the revolutions of 1848 and the end of the nineteenth century, Pressburg witnessed repeated and extensive anti-Jewish rioting, in 1850, 1882 (in response to the Tiszaeszlár blood libel), 1887, and 1889. The Jewish community of the city numbered 4,500 in 1869 and expanded to its peak of 18,000 in 1940, 13 percent of the population. Many Jews in the city spoke Hungarian and considered themselves of Hungarian nationality. In 1918, Bratislava was included in the new country of Czechoslovakia.

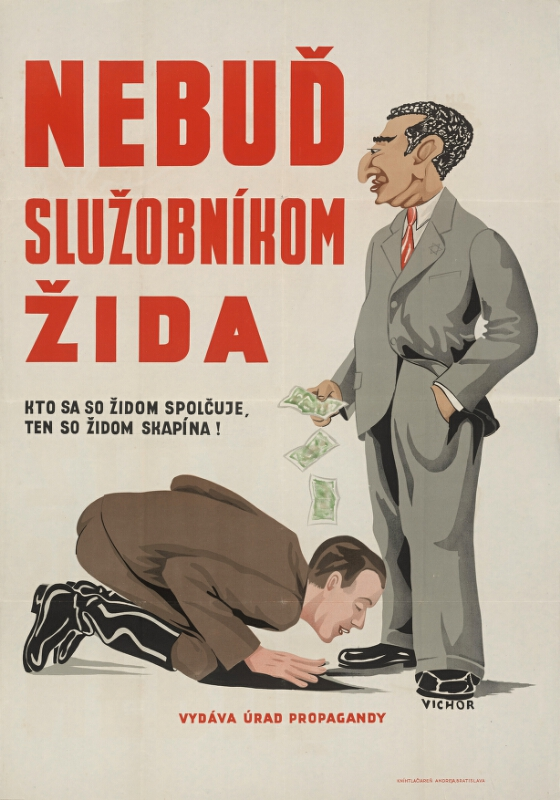
A Slovak State propaganda poster exhorts readers not to "be a servant to the Jew".

The Slovak State, a one-party state of the far-right, fascist Hlinka's Slovak People's Party (HSĽS), declared its independence from Czechoslovakia on 14 March 1939. Although the Slovak State was an Axis client state during World War II, it enjoyed considerable latitude in domestic policy, including anti-Jewish actions. Anti-Jewish laws were passed in 1940 and 1941, depriving Jews of their property via Aryanization and redistributing it to Slovaks viewed by the regime as more deserving. The Slovak State organized the deportation of 58,000 of its own Jewish citizens to German-occupied Poland in 1942, which was carried out by the paramilitary Hlinka Guard and regular policemen. On 29 August 1944, Germany invaded Slovakia, sparking the Slovak National Uprising. The fighting, and German countermeasures, devastated much of the country; nearly 100 villages were burned by Einsatzgruppe H. Thousands of people, including several hundred Jews, were murdered in Slovakia, and at least another 10,000 Jews were deported. Anti-regime forces included Slovak Army defectors, Agrarians, Communists, and Jews. Altogether 69,000 of the 89,000 Jews in the Slovak State were murdered. About 3,500 Jews from Bratislava survived. After the war, Slovakia was reincorporated into Czechoslovakia; it retained a government in Bratislava with significant autonomy. By April 1946, 7,000 Jews were living in the city, only 1,000 of whom had lived there before the war. (Note: Many Jewish survivors from the countryside moved to the cities in search of greater protection, more anonymity, and access to Jewish organizations.)

Conflict over Aryanization and restitution characterized postwar relations between Jews and non-Jewish Slovaks. For many Slovaks, restitution meant returning property that they had paid for under the then-existing law, developed, and considered theirs. From the perspective of Jews, however, it was the obligation of those in possession of stolen property to return it. Former partisans, veterans of the Czechoslovak armies abroad, and ex-political prisoners were prioritized for appointment as national administrators of previously Jewish businesses or residences. In some cases, national administrators were appointed even though the owners or their heirs were still alive. The newly appointed national administrators considered their gains just reward for their sacrifices during the war—a rationale that was endorsed by the government. Disputes were polarized by prewar antisemitism combined with the residual effects of the Slovak State's anti-Jewish propaganda and the economic interests of non-Jewish Slovaks in the contested properties. However, informal agreements between former Jewish owners and national managers were not uncommon and were usually approved by the authorities.

The first postwar anti-Jewish riots occurred in 1945, in Košice (2 May), Prešov (July), Bardejov (22 July), Topoľčany (24 September), and Trebišov (14 November). Former partisans were involved in some of these events. There were no major anti-Jewish incidents in Bratislava between the end of the war and the summer of 1946. Most of the culprits of the attacks were not prosecuted. Top officials in the Slovak autonomous government, such as Jozef Lettrich and Ján Beharka, did not issue clear condemnations of the attacks and even blamed Jews. The organizations ÚSŽNO (Central Union of Jewish Religious Communities in Slovakia) and SRP (Association of Racially Persecuted People) advocated for the rights of Holocaust survivors. The SRP advocated for the rights of people persecuted for their Jewish ancestry who did not belong to the Jewish religious community.

== Lead-up ==
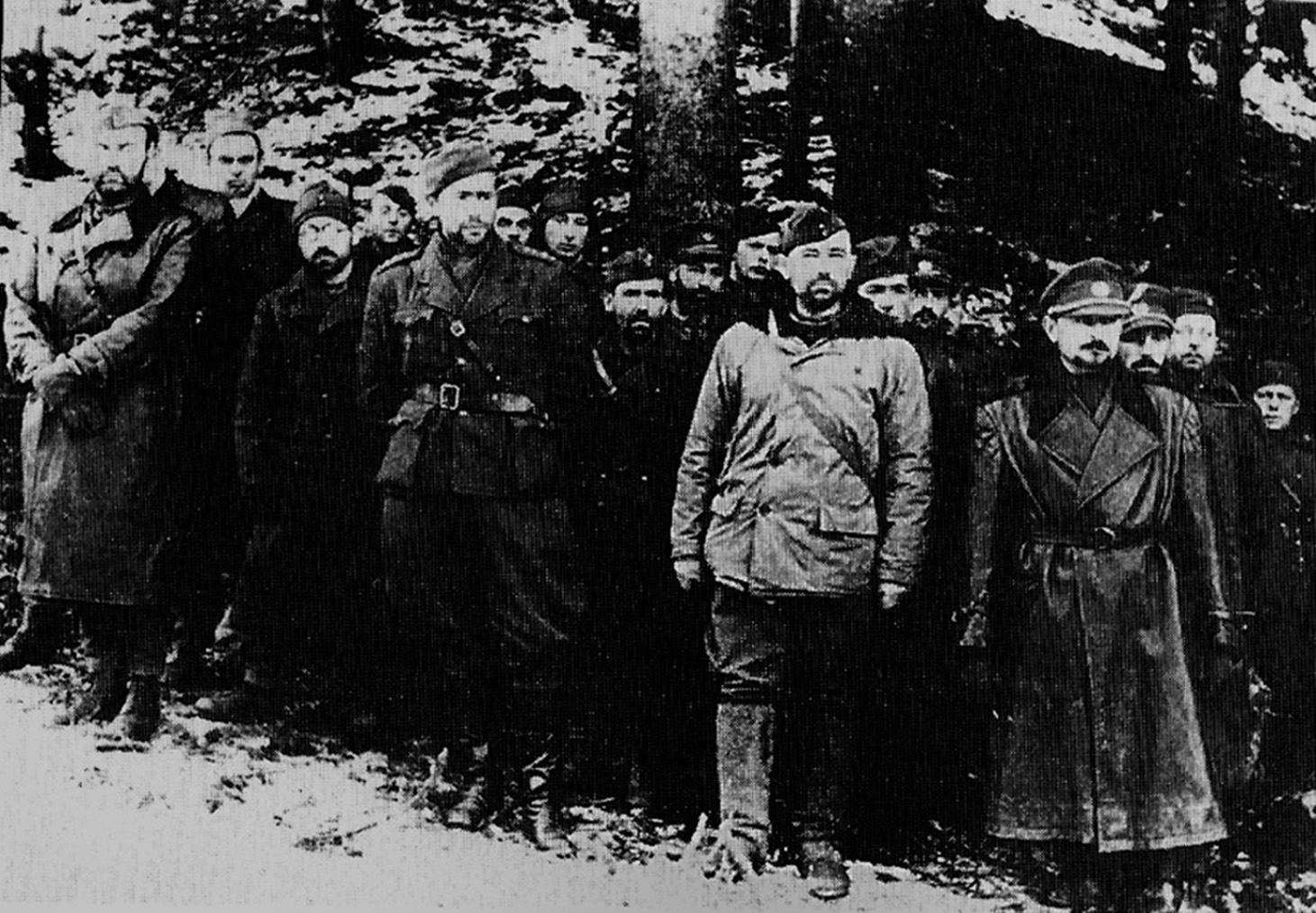
Slovak partisans during the Slovak National Uprising

After the September 1945 Topoľčany pogrom, the central Czechoslovak government in Prague pressured the autonomous Slovak government to adopt a law for the restitution of Aryanized property. In May 1946, the Slovak autonomous government passed the Restitution Act 128/1946, which canceled Aryanizations in cases where the victim was judged to be loyal to the Czechoslovak state. Jews could regain their property via the court system, rather than local authorities, which were less favorable to their claims. At this time, most of the Aryanized property was in the hands of either the Aryanizers or national administrators. The government faced overwhelming public pressure not to implement the law and many officials refused to implement it. The restitution law triggered a resurgence of popular anti-Jewish sentiment which led to the riots at the Partisan Congress.

In postwar Slovakia, anti-Jewish leaflets appeared regularly, despite mostly unsuccessful attempts by the state to seek out and prosecute their creators. Multiple leaflets gave Jews an ultimatum to leave the country by the end of July 1946; Slovak historian Michal Šmigeľ suggests that the similarities in the leaflets imply that there was a coordinated campaign. In late July and early August, leaflets appeared with the phrases "Beat the Jews!", "Now or never, away with the Jews!", and even "Death to the Jews!". (Note: "Bite Židov!" (29 July in Bratislava), "Teraz alebo nikdy preč so Židmi!" (1 August in Zlaté Moravce) and "Smrť Židom!" (1/2 August in Žilina).) During the last week of July, posters were put up around Bratislava with slogans such as "Attention Jew, a partisan is coming to beat Jews", "Czechoslovakia is for Slovaks and Czechs, Palestine is for Jews", "Jews to Palestine!" "Jews out!" and "Hang the Jews!" (Note: "Pozor žide, partisan ide židov biť" "ČSR pre Slovákov a Čechov, Palestína pre židákov" "Židia do Palestíny!" "Židia von!" "Židov obesiť!") In early July, two former partisans in Bytča repeatedly attacked Jews; an incident involving Jews and several former partisans occurred in Humenné on 27 July. The next day, provocateurs tried to incite anti-Jewish rioting in Trenčianske Teplice. From mid-July 1946, minor anti-Jewish incidents were occurring on an almost daily basis in Bratislava. For example, on 20 July, two men publicly hounded Jews on Kapucínska Street during the day, one of them "publicly calling all Hlinka Guardsmen, Hlinka Party members, and partisans to unite against the Jews". (Note: "... verejne volal všetkých gardistov, hlinkovcov ako aj partizánov, aby sa spojili proti Židom.") That night, Jews were assaulted on various streets, especially Kapucínska and Zámocká Streets. The SRP complained of systematically organized anti-Jewish demonstrations which pointed towards a future pogrom, (Note: Full quote from the SRP: "... výtržnosti, ktoré v Bratislave už zistiteľné sústavne organizované a môžu byť čoskoro koreňom ďalších a pozdejších protižidovských verejných demonštrácií, ba pogromov.") which according to Šmigeľ was "not far from the truth".

The First National Congress of Slovak Partisans (Slovak: Prvý celoslovenský zjazd partizánov), also known as the Partisan Congress (Partizánsky zjazd), took place between 2 and 4 August 1946. The Slovak authorities had intelligence anticipating riots at the Partisan Congress. On 31 July, podplukovník Rudolf Viktorin of the Czechoslovak police met with ÚSŽNO leaders and told them that he expected trouble from "reactionary elements" at the congress. Masariak, a representative of the Union of Slovak Partisans, met with the SRP. He told them that a thousand politically reliable former partisans were on hand to protect the Jews in Bratislava. However, the police erred in planning the strictest security measures for the evening of 3 August to the morning of 5 August—when the main group of former partisans were expected to be in the city. Previous to that, only 250–300 delegates were scheduled to attend meetings. Contrary to expectations, two to three thousand former partisans arrived in Bratislava on 2 August; total attendance at the congress was estimated at fifteen thousand. Many of the partisans were armed. The local police went on alert and the SRP set up an observation station in the Jewish quarter to report on incidents by telephone.

== Riots ==
=== 1–2 August ===
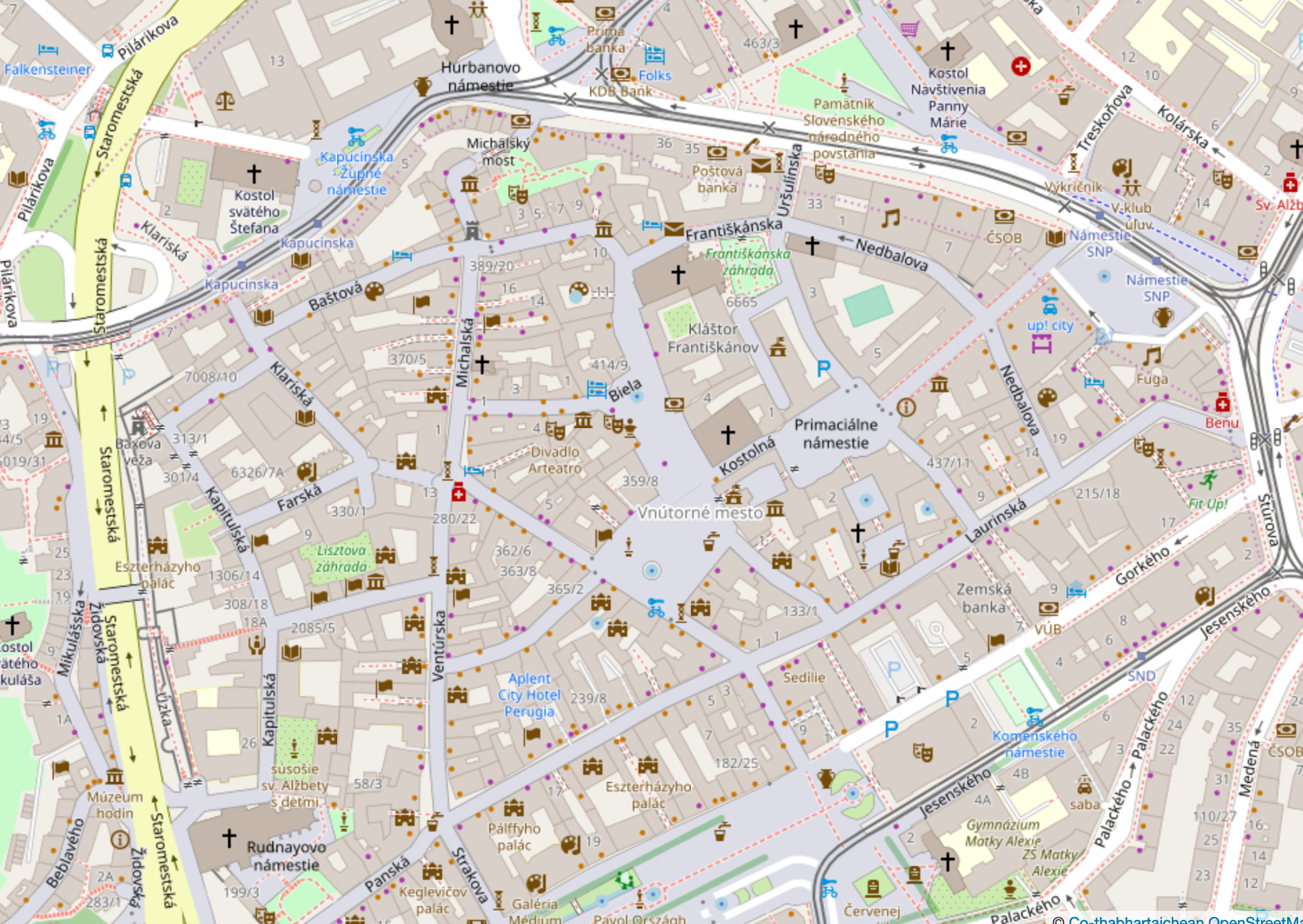
Clockwise from lower left: Židovská Street, Kapucínska Street, Stalin Square, Laurinská Street. Svoradova Street is just to the left of the upper left corner of the map. Židovská Street (literally "Jewish street") was the heart of the historical Jewish quarter, dating from the end of the sixteenth century.

The riots began close to midnight on 1 August, and bled into the early hours of 2 August. Several men identifying themselves as partisans showed up at František Hoffmann's apartment on Kupeckého Street and threatened to shoot him if he refused to open the door. The attackers beat him with canes and stole clothes, shoes, cigarettes, and 400 Czechoslovak koruna (Kčs) in cash, causing 18,000 Kčs in damage. (Note: Equivalent to $8 stolen and $360 in damage in 1946 dollars, according to the official exchange rate of 50 Kčs/USD, or $130 stolen, $5800 damage in current dollars.) One left behind his Czechoslovak Medal of Merit. Later that night and the following day, Jewish apartments at 30–32 Židovská Street were robbed. A effigy was hung at Sloboda Square with a sign stating "Hang all Jews", (Note: "Všetkých Židov obesiť") while pedestrians on Kapucínska Street were assaulted. SRP reported that these attacks were carried out by men wearing partisan uniforms as well as soldiers, officers, and civilians. The police dispersed the crowd, but did not make any arrests. Later, an apartment on Schreiberova Street was broken into, the residents beaten and the property vandalized. The Jewish community kitchen was also attacked, but the army intervened and dispersed the crowd.

In the evening on 2 August, Vojtech Winterstein, SRP chairman, called Arnošt Frischer, who led the Council of Jewish Religious Communities in Bohemia and Moravia, telling him that the Jews in the city feared an increase in the rioting. He also mentioned that two hand grenades had been thrown into the Jewish community offices in Komárno and an increase in antisemitic incidents on trains and at stations. The next day, Frischer called deputy prime minister Petr Zenkl, and received assurances from Lettrich that the situation was completely under control. However, after Winterstein's call, around 20:30, a group including former partisans stopped passersby to check their identification and beat Jews. Another group of former partisans and civilians gathered on a street in order to attack Jews. The rabbi Šimon Lebovič was beaten and robbed in his home. The Jewish kitchen was attacked again; Jews present were assaulted and 15,000 Kčs was stolen. (Note: Equivalent to $300 in 1946 dollars, or $4800 in current dollars.) After Winterstein notified Frischer of these events, the Ministry of the Interior assured Frischer that the incidents were not serious and would not reoccur due to security measures.

=== 3 August ===
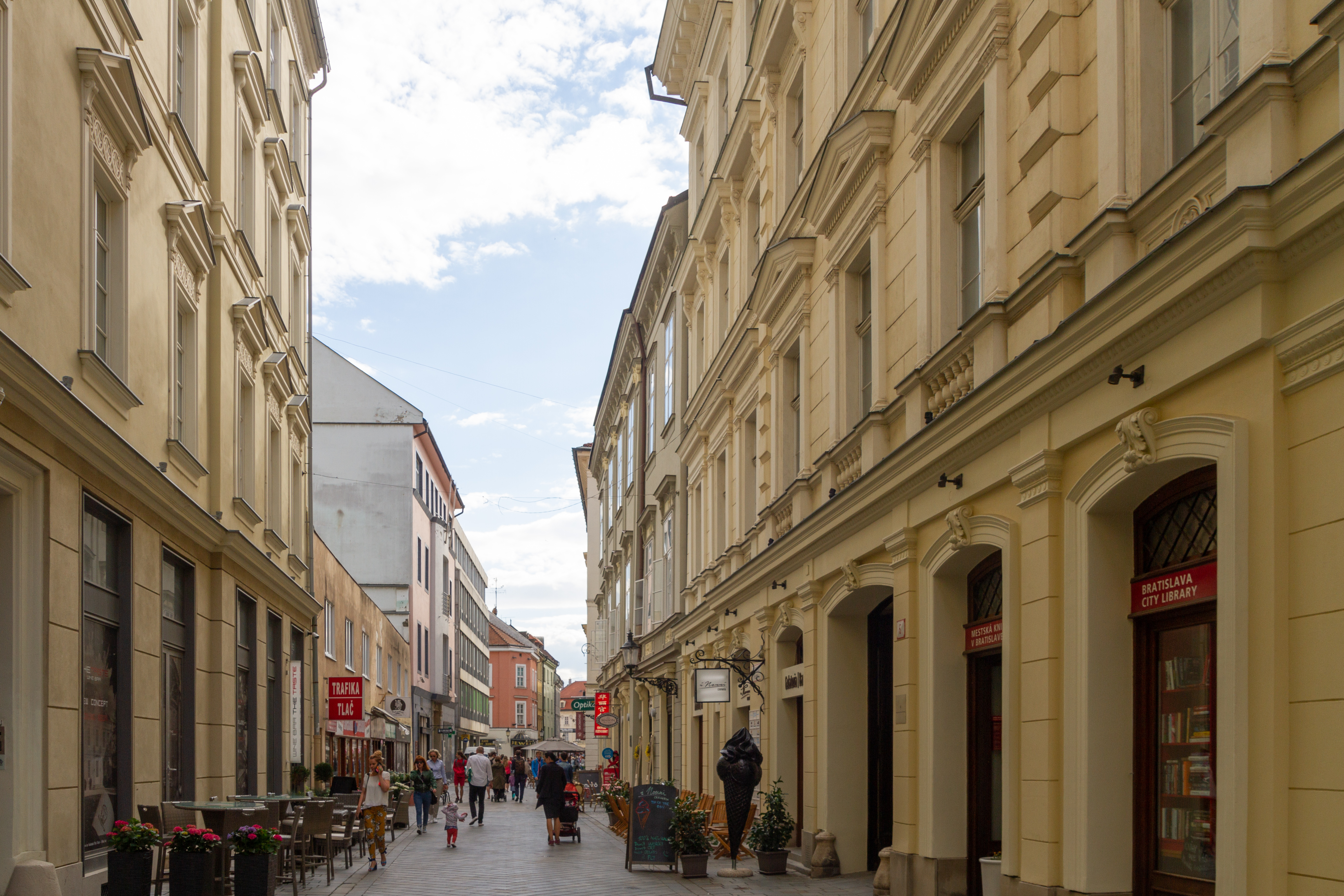
Laurinská Street in the Inner City

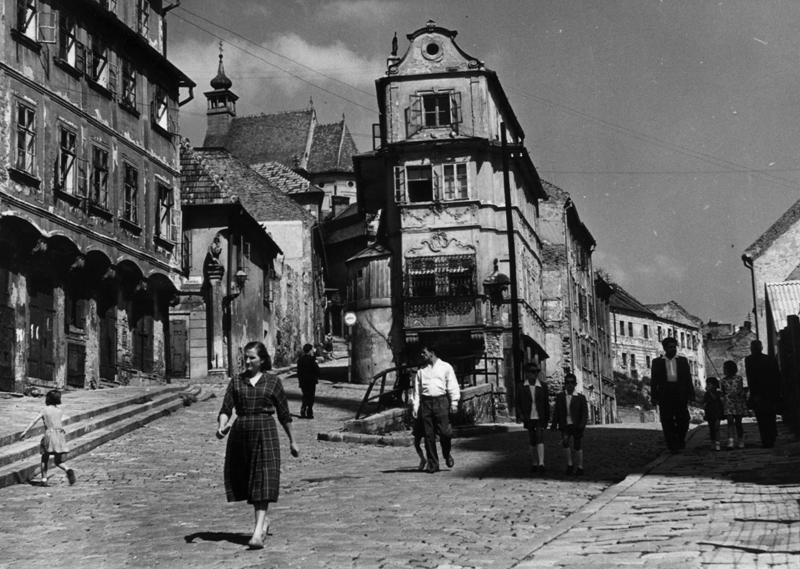
Židovská in the 1930s

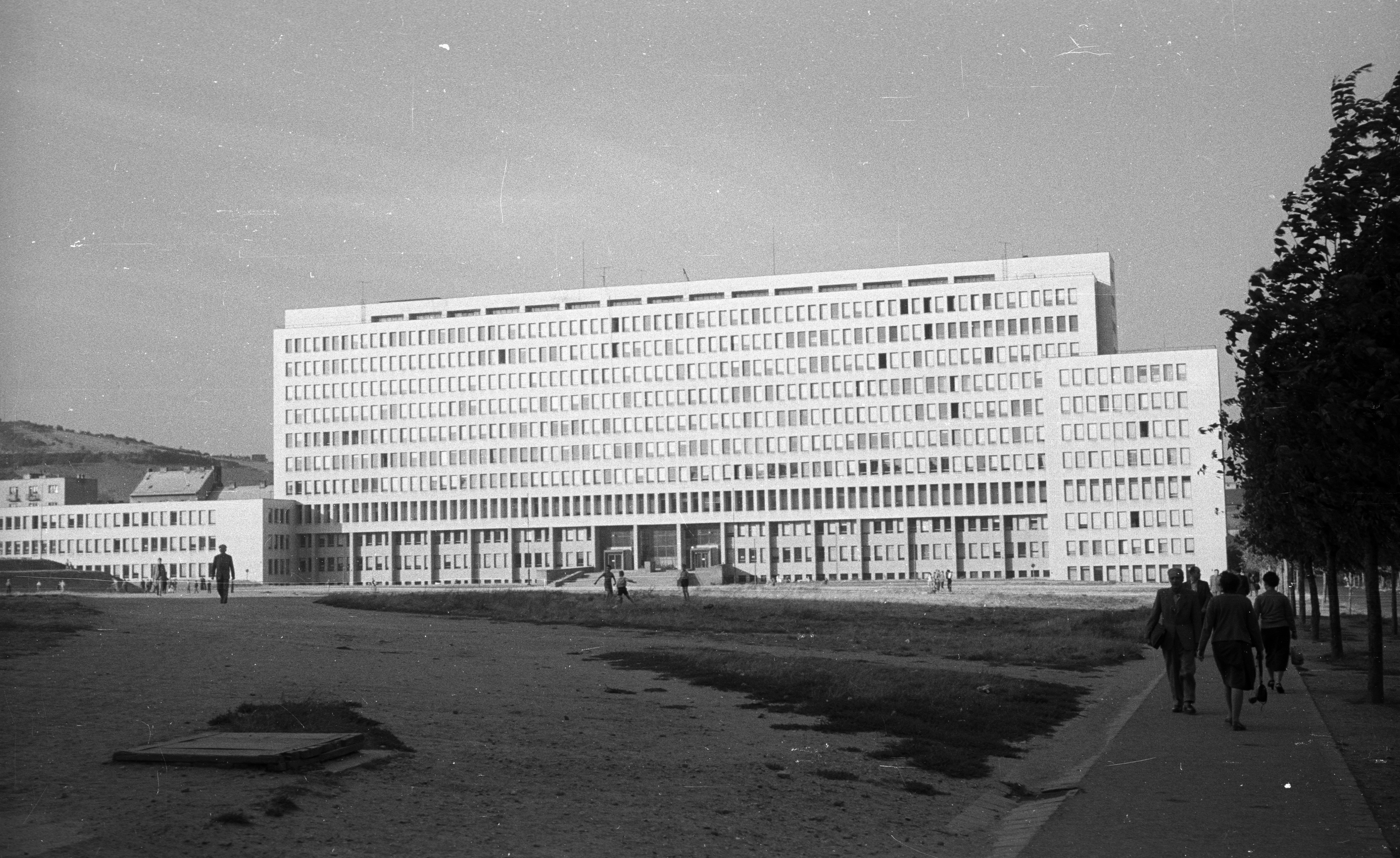
Sloboda Square in 1959

According to a police report, violence continued until 01:30 on 3 August, when two grenades were thrown into Pavol Weiss' house, where three Jewish families lived, without causing injury. During the day, Jews were attacked on the streets, especially Leningradská and Laurinská Streets. In the afternoon, a crowd of up to a thousand people shouting anti-Jewish slogans tried to break onto Židovská Street from Župné Square. Slovak politicians Karol Šmidke, Ladislav Holdoš, and Gustáv Husák addressed the demonstrators, ineffectually attempting to calm the situation. After their departure, the rioters were stopped by the police. At 16:00, a crowd—described as about fifty "radicalized partisans" (Note: "sfanatizovaných partizánov") in a police report—attacked Pavol Rybár's apartment on Laurinská Street after Ružena Dobrická accused Rybár of abducting her husband. The police and a group of former partisans led by Anton Šagát intervened to stop the rioters, but not before Rybár's personal documents had been stolen along with 5,000 Kčs. (Note: Equivalent to $100 in 1946 dollars, or $1600 in current dollars.)

Throughout the evening, small groups of rioters robbed Jewish residences on Kupeckého, Laurinská, Svoradova, and Židovská Streets. A considerable number of police had been diverted to Modra, due to a false rumor that some partisans had gone there to attack Jews. At 21:00 in October Square a crowd described as mostly partisans in the police report assaulted the Jewish businessman Manuel Landa, who had to be hospitalized after he was hit on the head. At 22:00, a crowd reported to be 300 strong in a subsequent police report chased a Jew on Kolárska Street, who took refuge in a police station. The rioters broke into the station, vandalized it, and cut the telephone line. Other Jews were injured at Sloboda Square. At 23:00, more rioters attacked Eugen Gwürt's residence on Svoradova Street and beat him, causing severe injuries, as well as robbing the apartment. Some former partisans were arrested and briefly detained at the city hall, but were released before they could be identified.

=== 4–6 August ===
On 4 August, former partisans held a parade at which anti-Jewish slogans were shouted, especially by the contingents from Topoľčany, Žilina, Spišská Nová Ves, and Zlaté Moravce. There were also riots that morning in front of the Slovak National Theater, especially by the former partisans from eastern Slovakia. Jews were physically attacked on Svoradova and Zamocká Streets, but the rioters were dispersed by police and several of the attackers arrested. On 5 August, the Jewish kitchen was attacked for the third time, reportedly by twelve partisans, causing several injuries among the Jews there. A boarding school for Jewish girls on Šrajberova Street was also vandalized; police intervened to stop the damage. Physical attacks on Jews and robbery of their apartments continued. Winterstein told Frischer that thousands of Jews had left the city for fear of being targeted. Frischer responded with more appeals to the Czechoslovak authorities, who again assured him that the situation was under control.

By the time the riots ended on 6 August, participants at the congress were reported to have robbed at least ten apartments and injured at least nineteen people (four seriously). The actual number of injuries was probably much higher than this, especially as minor injuries—probably dozens—were not recorded. Along with anti-Jewish incidents, the Partisan Congress was accompanied by non-racially motivated fights and disturbances caused by persons under the influence of alcohol. Perpetrators included actual partisan veterans, people pretending to be ex-partisans, disgruntled residents of the city, and some who had come from elsewhere, including Aryanizers, peasants, national administrators, and supporters of the former HSĽS regime. Drunkenness, lax security, crowd effects, and anonymity due to the large number of visitors all played a role in the rioting. Thirty-one arrests were made, but most detainees were released quickly and without being charged. The police were reluctant to arrest partisans. Possible reasons for this include a belief that crimes committed by partisans should be dealt with internally, the difficulty of arresting armed persons, and the sympathy of some policemen with the rioters. Winterstein criticized the police response, arguing that law enforcement tended to arrive late and release detained persons quickly, who then went on to make additional attacks. (Note: "Polícia prichádza dosť neskoro, zatýka Tudí, ale prepúšťa ich za krátky čas a tieto osoby sa potom opäť vracajú k útoku. Nejde o pogrom, nie je hluk, nie sú veľké masy. Prepadávanie sa deje v malých skupinách.")

=== Elsewhere in Slovakia ===
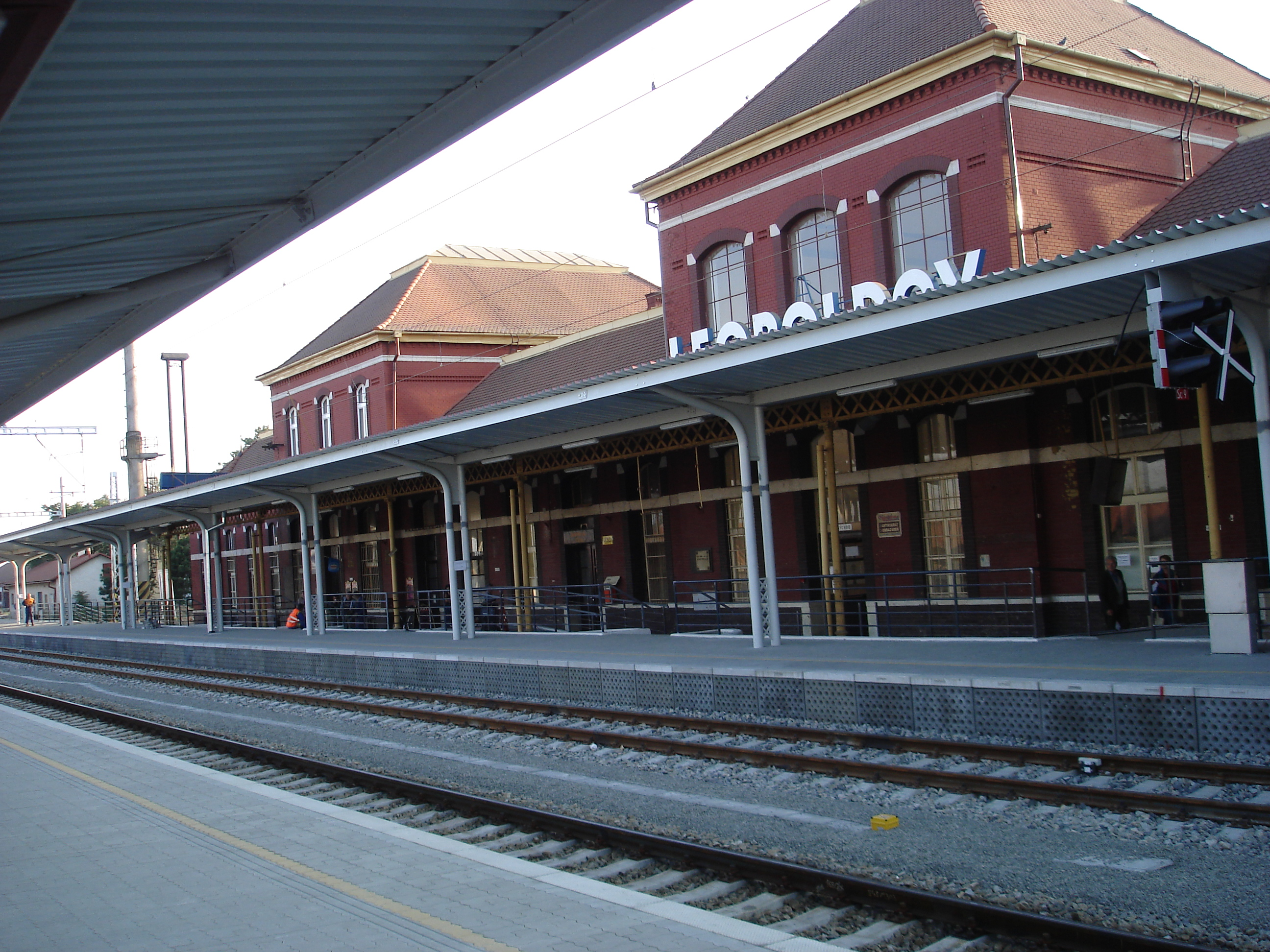
Train station in Leopoldov

In addition to the riots in Bratislava, other anti-Jewish incidents occurred in August 1946 in several cities and towns in northern, eastern, and southern Slovakia. These included Nové Zámky (2 August and 4 August), Žilina (4–6 August), Komárno (4 August), Čadca (5 August), Dunajská Streda, Šahy (8–9 August), Liptovský Svätý Mikuláš, Beluša, Tornaľa (11 August), Šurany (17–18 August), Veľká Bytča, and other places. Some of the partisans who had been at the congress in Bratislava went to Nové Zámky on 4 August, attacking the Ungar café at 19:30, beating the owner so severely he was unable to work, and stabbing six Jewish patrons. Other Jews were beaten or stabbed in the streets of the town by a band of ten to twenty partisans or robbed at gunpoint in their apartments. The events continued the next day, with another five or six Jews injured.

In Žilina, partisans returning from Bratislava shouted anti-Jewish slogans, assaulted Jews on the streets, and made a "partisan raid" on the Hotel Metropol. About fifteen people were injured as a result of the disturbances. In Rajecké Teplice on 4 August, partisans checked the identity cards of hotel guests and insulted two of them. In Zbehy and Leopoldov, partisans returning by train attacked Jewish residences near the station. In Nitra, a uniformed partisan threatened to shoot any Jews he saw in the street on 29 August. (Note: "Ktorého Žida dňa 29. augusta 1946 uvidím na ulici, ho odstrelím.") The windows of Jewish residences were broken in Šurany and Levice, while in Čadca a bomb was thrown into the garden of a nationalized enterprise managed by a Jew. Minor anti-Jewish demonstrations took place over the following days in Topoľčany, Banská Bystrica, Trnava, Komárno and Želiezovce. Anti-Jewish leaflets reappeared in Revúca, Michalovce and in several places in eastern Slovakia. One suggested that the last of the "Ten Commandmants of the brave Slovak Catholic" was "To guard against the Jews and Czechs". (Note: "Desatoro prikázaní statočného Slováka katolíka"... "Na stráž proti Židom a čechom.") Police detained only a few people as a result of these attacks. Slovak historian Ján Mlynárik suggests that the occurrence of similar events in multiple locations in Slovakia may indicate that they were planned in advance.

== Media coverage ==
On 6 August 1946, the state-controlled Slovak News Agency denied the riots had occurred, claiming that foreign newspapers had printed incorrect information. The next day, the news agency released another report, accusing illegal organizations linked to foreign interests of conspiring to distribute anti-Jewish propaganda to partisans arriving in Bratislava by train. The Czech News Agency reported the riots, but claimed that those responsible were supporters of the Hlinka party and not partisans. The more accurate coverage by the Czech News Agency was, according to Czech historian Jan Láníček, "achieved by political negotiations and carefully crafted behind-the-scenes threats" by Frischer and the Council of Jewish Religious Communities in Bohemia and Moravia to publicize the story in foreign media. Frischer considered the release of the story and the government's promise to protect Jews to be a victory. Hungarian newspapers also covered the riots.

On 20 August, the government newspaper Národná obroda claimed that Hungarians had colluded with former Hlinka Guardsmen and HSĽS members to cause the riots. The article also claimed that the grenades used on the Komárno attack were of Hungarian make and that the anti-Jewish leaflets were written in poor Slovak, indicating that their authors were Hungarians. In fact, most of the anti-Jewish rioters were Slovak, not Hungarian. Mlynárik points out that riots also took place in August 1946 in the northern and eastern parts of Slovakia, where Hungarians did not live, belying the official narrative.

Čas, the newsletter of the non-Communist Democratic Party, referred to isolated incidents in its 6 August article on the rioting: "During the first congress of Slovak partisans, a few minor, insignificant incidents occurred in which the partisans showed their dissatisfaction with the resolution of pressing social issues." (Note: "Z príležitosti prvého zjazdu slovenských partizánov stalo sa niekoľko menší ch, bezvýznamných incidentov, v ktorých partizáni dávali najavo svoju nespokojnosť s riešením ich pálčivých sociálnych otázok.") Čas downplayed antisemitism among the partisans, instead blaming former members of the Hlinka Guard. On 11 August, Pravda, the official daily of the Communist Party of Slovakia, published an article on the events, blaming "various influential groups" for conspiring with "anti-state elements" and fomenting unrest. Both the Democratic Party and the Communist Party officially condemned antisemitism, blaming the other party for it.

On 5 September, the newsletter of the ÚSŽNO published an article on the riots, "What happened in Slovakia", which claimed that "every child in Slovakia" had known that there would be riots at the Partisan Congress. The article also stated that on 7 February 1946, a circular had been sent by the Union of Slovak Partisans in Dunajská Streda to other branches, calling for anti-Jewish actions and that the central leadership of the Union of Slovak Partisans knew of this circular but took no action. (Note: Original title: "Co se stalo na Slovensku". Full quote: "Že v souvislosti s chystaným sjezdem partyzánů dojde k protižidovským demonstracím a výtržnostem, vědělo na Slovensku každé malé dítě. Ve vlacích, na nádražích a v hospodách se otevřeně agitovalo. Zdá se však, že to bylo zatajováno příslušným ústředním orgánům v Praze. Slovenské bezpečnostní orgány a organizátoři sjezdu byli na nebezpečí upozorňováni a sami na ně též varovně poukazovali. Isteže vedenie partizánov nielenže s týmito nekalými akciami nemalo nič spoločné, ale práve naopak, pracovalo proti nim. Ale všechno, co se tu podnikalo, bylo polovičaté, uskutečňované bez plného přesvědčení a zodpovědnosti.") The Council of Jewish Religious Communities in Bohemia and Moravia forwarded the article to Prime Minister Klement Gottwald, asking him to investigate the allegations; Gottwald forwarded the request to his office. The resulting undated report, by Ján Čaplovič, quoted the Interior Ministry Commissioner of Czechoslovakia, Michal Ferjencik, who blamed Jews for not speaking Slavic languages, failing to reconstruct the country, and trading on the black market. (Note: Quote from Ferjencik: "Príčiny vzplanutia antisemitizmu na Slovensku, ktoré boli ojedinelé, sú tieto: V prvom rade dedičstvo 6 rokov rozširovanej protižidovskej propagandy, silné protižidovské hnutie v Maďarsku a v Poľsku, nevyriešená otázka vlastníckeho práva arizáciou dotknutých poľnohospo-dárskych majetkov. Ďalej repatriovalo mnoho takých Židov, ktorí unás nikdy nebývali, neovládajú ani jeden zo slovanských jazykov, ako aj to, že sa všeobecne nezapojovali do všeužitočných prác pri rekonštrukcii vojnou zničených častí Slovenska. K tomu pristupuje i značne vysoká ich úč asť na čiernom obchode.") Čaplovič said that the partisan villages destroyed during the Slovak National Uprising ought to be higher priority than restitution to Jewish survivors.

== Reaction ==
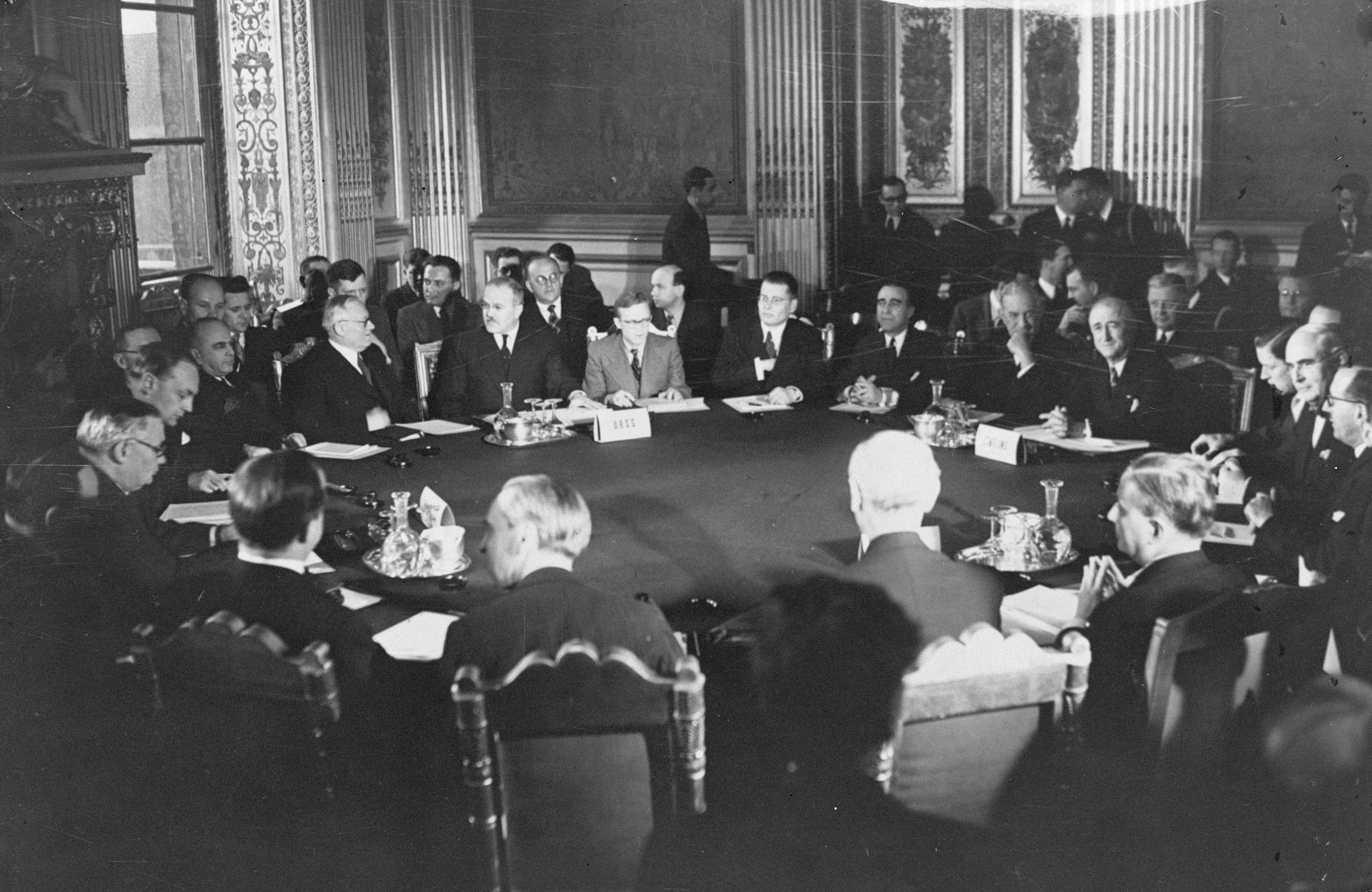
Paris Peace Conference, 1946

The Ministry of Information successfully pressured Frischer not to hold a press conference to inform journalists of the riots, on the grounds that the dissemination of information on the riots as the Paris Peace Conference was ongoing "could harm Czechoslovakia". (Note: "...že roz šíř ení zprávy v době mírové konference by mohlo ČSR škoditi.") Jewish leaders argued that the riots were already causing bad publicity for Czechoslovakia, therefore making it an urgent matter to take action against them. On 7 August, Frischer and a group of SRP leaders met with officials in the Ministry of Information, presenting a detailed report on the riots. They were assured that the ministry "has taken and will take all necessary steps to prevent the reoccurrence of such and similar disturbances" (Note: "Prehlasujem Vám, že ministerstvo vnútra podniklo a podnikne so všetkou rozhodnosťou všetky potrebné kroky, aby k takým a podobným výtržnostiam nikdy nedošlo.") and that the policemen who had sided with the rioters would be disciplined. Frischer disagreed, pointing out that only seventeen people had been formally arrested, of whom twelve had been since released, and the government had not actively condemned antisemitism. In response to criticism, the Slovak government did not condemn the riots but instead blamed Hungarians in Slovakia, arguing that the Hungarians were trying to discredit Czechoslovakia at the Paris Peace Conference. The coverage given to the events in the Hungarian media was supposed to substantiate this theory. On 8 August, Minister of the Interior Václav Nosek opened investigations into the riots and the role of the police in them. In September, members of the security forces were threatened with dismissal if they did not act decisively against anti-Jewish riots, and they were ordered to seek out and punish the attackers in previous demonstrations.

Due to the government's concern about disturbances during the second anniversary celebrations of the Slovak National Uprising later in August, hundreds of policemen were transferred from Czechia to Slovakia. Ultimately, these disturbances did not materialize with the only antisemitic actions consisting of the distribution of leaflets. In a note dated 10 August, Main Headquarters of National Security (HVNB) claimed that the riots were "orchestrated with the intention of sullying the reputation of the [Czechoslovak] Republic at the [Paris] Peace Conference". (Note: "...celá táto akcia je riadená s úmyslom poškodiť čistý štít Republiky na mierovej konferencii...") On 19 August, the agency distributed an order to local police authorities emphasizing that anti-Jewish speeches and demonstrations were to be suppressed. Partisan organizations were also ordered to seek out and eliminate antisemites among their membership. A 1947 report, the last known official document relating to the riots, downplayed the events, asserted that the police had intervened in all of the anti-Jewish attacks, and claimed that all perpetrators of the attacks had been prosecuted—despite the fact that no known prosecutions resulted.

To prevent a reoccurrence of the rioting, the commissioner of internal affairs of the autonomous Slovak government recommended dismissing or arresting members of the security forces who had participated in anti-Jewish actions, and a crackdown on public gatherings. The riots also caused a turning point in the restitution process. Justifying its actions in terms of the public interest, the government forbade informal agreements between former Jewish owners and national managers. It also suspended restitution on the grounds that it required an executive order, although the suspension was soon called off. Nevertheless, most Jewish property was not returned to the owners or heirs, a result which angered many Jews. In Frischer's words, "everything points to the conclusion that [preventing restitution] was the goal of the rioters, and the street won". (Note: "... ž e vše poukazuje k tomu, že to byl účel demonstrací a že tudiž ulice vyhrála...") In September 1946, the Ministry of the Interior announced that Jews who had declared German or Hungarian nationality on prewar censuses would be allowed to retain Czechoslovak citizenship, rather than face deportation. The government was seeking to counteract the negative coverage that it had received in the Western press, in part due to the riots in Bratislava.

== Aftermath ==
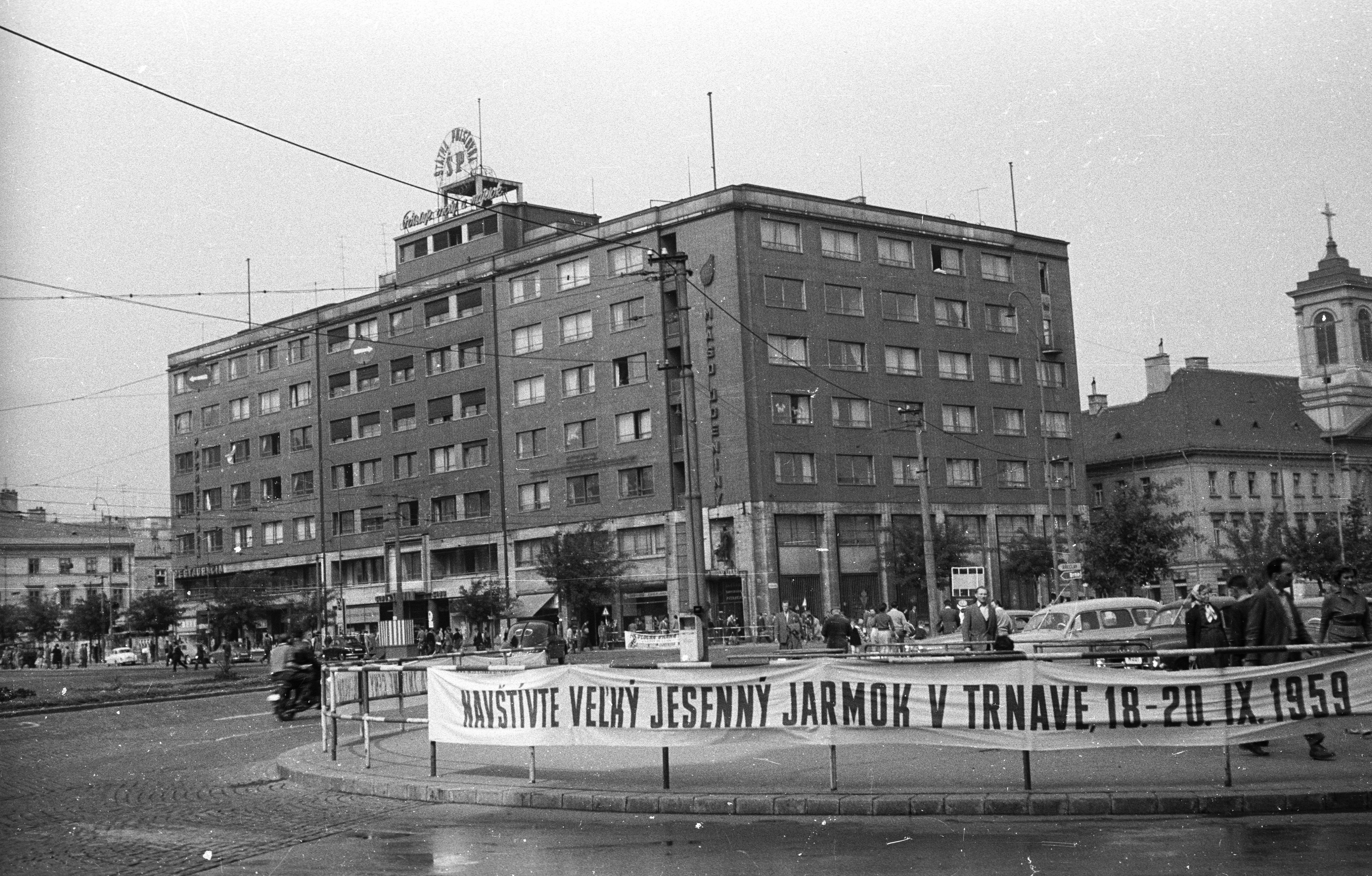
Stalin Square in 1959

Despite the government's security precautions, there were additional anti-Jewish riots in Bratislava on 20 and 21 August 1948. The riots originated in an altercation at a farmers' market in Stalin Square in which Emilia Prášilová, a pregnant non-Jewish Slovak woman, accused sellers of favoring Jews. Alica Franková, a Jewish woman, called Prášilová "an SS woman" and they attacked each other. After both women were arrested, passersby beat up another two Jewish women, one of whom was hospitalized. Yelling "Hang the Jews!" and "Jews out!", they sacked the same Jewish kitchen that had been attacked two years previously. Another attempted demonstration the next day was dispersed by police, and 130 rioters were arrested, of whom forty were convicted. The 1948 riots occurred at a time when antisemitic incidents were decreasing in Slovakia. About 80% of the Jews who lived in Slovakia immediately after the war had left by the end of 1949, mostly after the 1948 communist coup. The 1946 riots were one of the reasons that Bratislava Jews chose to emigrate.

== Sources ==
- Bumová, Ivica (2007). "Protižidovské výtržnosti v Bratislave v historickom kontexte (august 1946)" [Anti-Jewish riots in Bratislava (August 1946) in the historical context] (PDF). Pamäť národa (in Slovak) (3): 14–29. ISSN 1336-6297.
- Bumová, Ivica (2017). "Obraz židov v dobovej tlači v rokoch 1945–1948. Denníky Čas a Pravda." [The image of Jews in the contemporary press from 1945 to 1948: Newspapers Čas and Pravda]. In Vrzgulová, Monika; Kubátová, Hana (eds.). Podoby antisemitismu v Čechách a na Slovensku v 20. a 21. století [Forms of anti-Semitism in Czechia and Slovakia in the 20th and 21st centuries] (in Slovak). Prague: Karolinum Press. pp. 97–118. ISBN 978-80-246-3461-6.
- Cichopek, Anna (2014). Beyond Violence: Jewish Survivors in Poland and Slovakia, 1944–48. Cambridge: Cambridge University Press. ISBN 978-1-107-03666-6.
- Láníček, Jan (2013). Czechs, Slovaks and the Jews, 1938–48: Beyond Idealisation and Condemnation. New York: Springer. ISBN 978-1-137-31747-6.
- Láníček, Jan (2017). Arnošt Frischer and the Jewish Politics of Early 20th-Century Europe. London: Bloomsbury Academic. ISBN 978-1-4725-8590-5.
- Lônčíková, Michala (2019). "Atrocities in the borderland: anti-Semitic violence in eastern Slovakia (1945–1946)". European Review of History: Revue européenne d'histoire. 26 (6): 928–946. doi:10.1080/13507486.2019.1612328. S2CID 198704493.
- Lorman, Thomas (2019). The Making of the Slovak People's Party: Religion, Nationalism and the Culture War in Early 20th-Century Europe. London: Bloomsbury Publishing. ISBN 978-1-350-10938-4.
- Majerský, Radovan (2004). "Development of the Exchange Rate of the Czechoslovak Koruna" (PDF). Biatec. XII (1). National Bank of Slovakia: 23–26. ISSN 1335-0900.
- Mlynárik, Ján (2005). "Pogromy na Slovensku 1945–1948" [Pogroms in Slovakia 1945–1948]. Dějiny židů na Slovensku [History of the Jews in Slovakia] (in Czech). Prague: Academia. ISBN 978-80-200-1301-9.
- Rajcan, Vanda; Vadkerty, Madeline; Hlavinka, Ján (2018). "Slovakia". In Megargee, Geoffrey P.; White, Joseph R.; Hecker, Mel (eds.). Camps and Ghettos under European Regimes Aligned with Nazi Germany. Encyclopedia of Camps and Ghettos. Vol. 3. Bloomington: Indiana University Press. pp. 842–852. ISBN 978-0-253-02373-5.
- Šmigeľ, Michal (2011). "Protižidovské výtržnosti v Bratislave v rokoch 1946 a 1948 (v kontexte povojnových prejavov antisemitizmu na Slovensku)" [Anti-Jewish riots in Bratislava in 1946 and 1948 (in the context of postwar manifestations of antisemitism in Slovakia)]. In Medvecký, Matej (ed.). Fenomén Bratislava. Bratislava: Ústav pamäti národa. pp. 251–273. ISBN 978-80-893-3539-8.
