= Bratislava riots =

Many riots have occurred in Bratislava, currently the capital of Slovakia.

- Bratislava riots (1848)—anti-Jewish riots during Revolutions of 1848
- Bratislava riots in 1918, part of the post-World War I anti-Jewish violence in Czechoslovakia
- Bratislava riots (1939)—reported as anti-Jewish or anti-German riots
- Partisan Congress riots (1946)—anti-Jewish riots
- Bratislava riots (1948)—anti-Jewish riots
- Velvet Revolution (1989)
