= Czechoslovak myth =

Ahistorical image of interwar Czechoslovakia

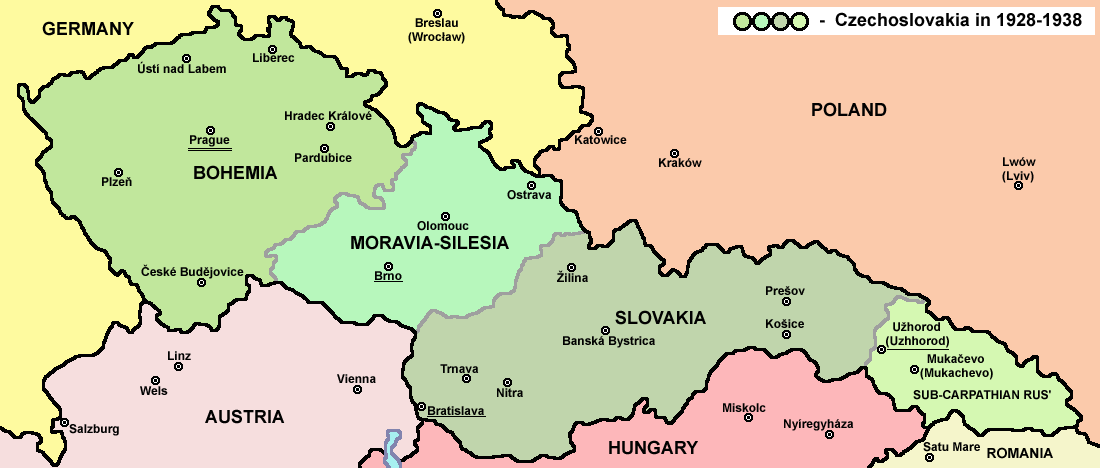
Interwar Czechoslovakia

The Czechoslovak myth is a narrative that Czechoslovakia between 1918 and 1938 was a tolerant and liberal democratic country, oriented towards Western Europe, and free of antisemitism compared to other countries in Central Europe and Eastern Europe. For example, the country was described as "a welcoming and tolerant place for Jews," and an "island of democracy in Eastern Europe".

== Jewish aspect ==
The alleged architects of the myth were Tomáš Masaryk and Edvard Beneš. Tatjana Lichtenstein notes that these politicians were "often depicted as tolerant, progressive, and politically sophisticated strategists bestowing rights on 'their' Jews".

However, Masaryk endorsed antisemitic theories about Jewish control of the press, writing to Beneš in October 1918: "Hilsner helped us a lot now: Zionists and other Jews have publicly accepted our programme." Beneš refused to sign a treaty guaranteeing minority rights to Czechoslovak Jews because he declared it to be a form of defamation against Czechoslovakia. When Jewish activists pressed the issue, Beneš referred to increasing antisemitism in Czechoslovakia and warned that further demands could "provoke renewed recriminations from one side or the other".

The myth of Czechoslovak exceptionalism was promoted in polemic fashion and exploited for political gain by Czechoslovak politicians from the Paris Peace Conference after World War I, throughout the First Czechoslovak Republic and the Czechoslovak government-in-exile, and in the Third Czechoslovak Republic until the 1948 Communist coup. Jan Láníček emphasizes the importance of a 1930 issue of the Jewish Daily Bulletin, dedicated to Masaryk and featuring praise from American Jewish leaders Stephen Samuel Wise and Felix Frankfurter, as well as the Zionist Vladimir Jabotinsky and American vice president Charles Curtis, especially for Masaryk's support for Zionism.

== "Masaryk cult" ==
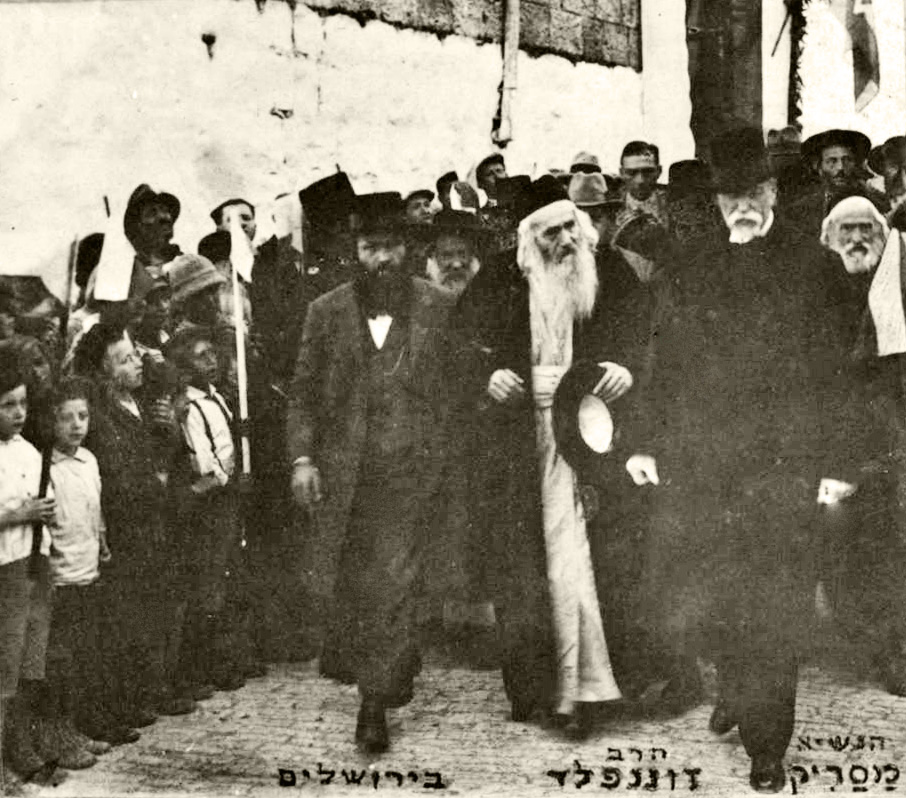
Tomáš Garrigue Masaryk (right) accompanied with Yosef Chaim Sonnenfeld on his visit in Jerusalem (1927)

According to Andrea Orzoff the "Masaryk cult", an element in the Czechoslovak myth, exaggerates the importance and positive qualities of Masaryk, while downplaying the role that domestic resistance played in securing Czechoslovak independence. However, historians disagree on whether "cult of personality" is the right term, noting the differences between Masaryk and Joseph Stalin.

== Historicity ==
Orzoff notes that "all successful myths incorporate elements of generally recognized truth":

- Czechoslovakia was the last central European state to retain its democracy, up until 1938;
- its minorities enjoyed greater protections than in other countries;
- and Czechoslovakia was in many respects closer to Western Europe than its neighbors.

She does not intend the term "myth" to be pejorative: "Rather, the term “myth” helps highlight the essentialist, fabulistic narrative underscoring political and academic discourse on the “natively democratic” Czechs and Czechoslovakia since 1918". However, the narrative is inconsistent with some events in Czechoslovak history, such as antisemitic violence between 1918 and 1920.

== See also ==
- Austria victim theory
- Vichy syndrome

== Sources ==
- Láníček, Jan (2013). Czechs, Slovaks and the Jews, 1938–48: Beyond Idealisation and Condemnation. New York: Springer. ISBN 978-1-137-31747-6.
- Lichtenstein, Tatjana (2014). "Jewish power and powerlessness: Prague Zionists and the Paris Peace Conference". East European Jewish Affairs. 44 (1): 2–20. doi:10.1080/13501674.2014.904583. S2CID 143998973.
- Orzoff, Andrea (2009). Battle for the Castle: The Myth of Czechoslovakia in Europe, 1914-1948. Oxford University Press. ISBN 978-0-19-970995-3.
