= Mlynárik =

Mlynárik is a Slovak surname. Notable people with the surname include:

- Ján Mlynárik (1933–2012), Czechoslovak politician and historian
- Zbynek Mlynarik (born Zbyněk Mlynárik in 1977), Austrian tennis player
