= Anti-Jewish violence in Czechoslovakia (1918–1920) =

Wave of anti-Jewish rioting and violence in Czechoslovakia

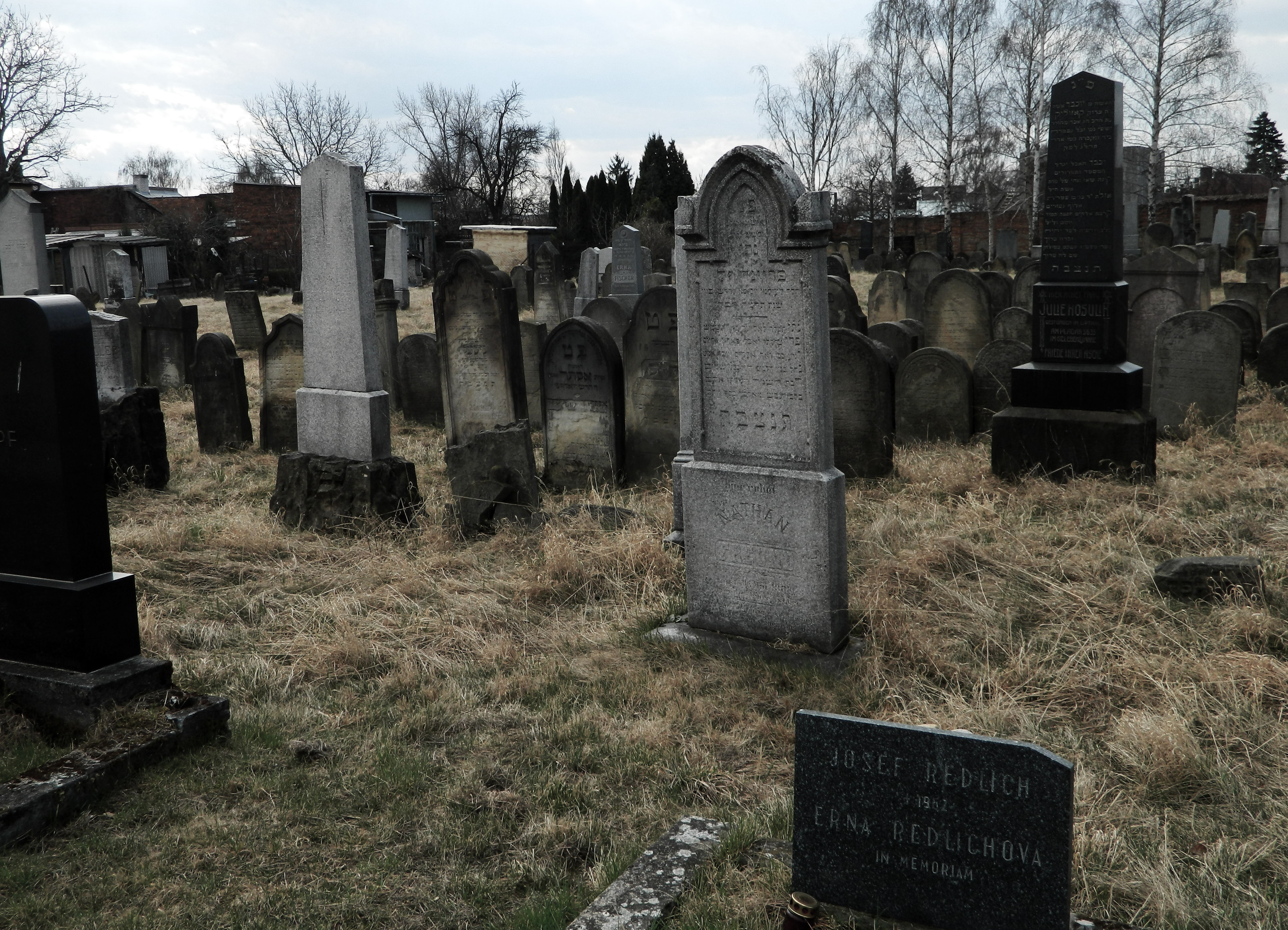
Jewish cemetery in Holešov, Moravia. Two Jews were killed in a pogrom in the town.

After World War I and during the formation of Czechoslovakia, a wave of anti-Jewish rioting and violence was unleashed against Jews and their property, especially stores.

== Causes ==
The main accusations leveled against Jews in Slovakia were that they were Hungarian-speakers and agents of the hated Hungarian state, from which Slovakia was trying to break free. In Bohemia and Moravia, many Jews had supported the Habsburgs, especially early on in the war, arousing the hatred of Czech patriots. Also, Jews were blamed for profiteering and black marketing during the wartime shortages. Another cause of the violence was the breakdown in Habsburg authority and weakness of the new Czechoslovak state, which had not yet established a monopoly on violence. Riots between Czechs and Germans also occurred.

== November pogroms ==
In Slovakia, violence occurred in November 1918. In Považská Bystrica (near Žilina), David Büchler's general store was robbed and destroyed on 5 November, causing damage of 300,000 Czechoslovak crowns (US$8,880 in 1920). Bands of former soldiers roamed the countryside looking for shops to rob, most of which belonged to Jews due to pre-existing economic patterns.

== December pogroms ==
In December 1918, the most severe pogroms occurred in Bohemia and Moravia. The worst was in Holešov on 3–4 December. Jewish-owned houses and shops were robbed, the synagogue and community offices were vandalized, and two Jews were murdered. Eventually the army intervened.

== Effect on international relations ==
While the violence was ongoing, Edvard Beneš, Tomáš Garrigue Masaryk, and other Czechoslovak politicians at the Paris Peace Conference portrayed Czechoslovakia as a liberal and tolerant country, relatively free of the antisemitism that plagued neighboring countries. A Czech Agrarian newspaper claimed that the violence was engineered by "Judeo-Germans ... organizing and hiring provocateurs" in order to ruin Czechoslovakia's reputation abroad. In 1919, the international Zionist activist Chaim Weizmann expressed concern about the violence, noting that it was "in complete contrast to the avowed Czech policy in Paris, and also to the public utterance of Minister Beneš".

== Aftermath ==
The violence continued from the disintegration of the Habsburg monarchy to the Paris peace treaties signed in 1919 and 1920. It was not nearly as severe as in Poland and Ukraine, where tens of thousands of Jews were murdered. After 1920, the violence died down. Interwar Czechoslovakia was the safest and least antisemitic country in central Europe for Jews, and it was the only one to retain a democratic government into the mid-1930s.

== Historiography ==
Many Czech historians have presented the violence as an aberration on the otherwise tolerant and democratic First Czechoslovak Republic. Zdeňek Fišer called Holešov the "last pogrom" and the end of a dark era. Others, including Michal Frankl and Miloslav Szabó, have placed the violence within a Czech nationalist discourse that excluded Jews from the Czechoslovak national community. According to American historian Michael Miller, the violence has been forgotten because it clashes with the Czechoslovak myth.
