= Zionists in Interwar Czechoslovakia =

- first edition cover
- Author: Tatjana Lichtenstein
- Publication date: April 18, 2016
- ISBN: 9780253018670

Zionists in Interwar Czechoslovakia: Minority Nationalism and the Politics of Belonging (2016) is a book by Tatjana Lichtenstein published by Indiana University Press. It discusses the rise of Zionism among Jews living in the First Czechoslovak Republic. Lichtenstein also challenges the Czechoslovak myth of exceptionalism by chronicling the constant accusations faced by Jews that they lacked national patriotism towards Czechoslovakia. The book received positive reviews.
