= Battle for the Castle =

2009 book by Andrea Orzoff

Battle for the Castle: The Myth of Czechoslovakia in Europe, 1914–1948
- Author: Andrea Orzoff
- Subject: Czechoslovak myth
- Publisher: Oxford University Press
- Publication date: 2009

Battle for the Castle: The Myth of Czechoslovakia in Europe, 1914–1948 is a 2009 book written by Andrea Orzoff and published by Oxford University Press. It argues that Czechoslovakia promoted an overly favorable view of itself, termed the Czechoslovak myth. Reviews were generally favorable.
