= Kolbasov =

- Municipality
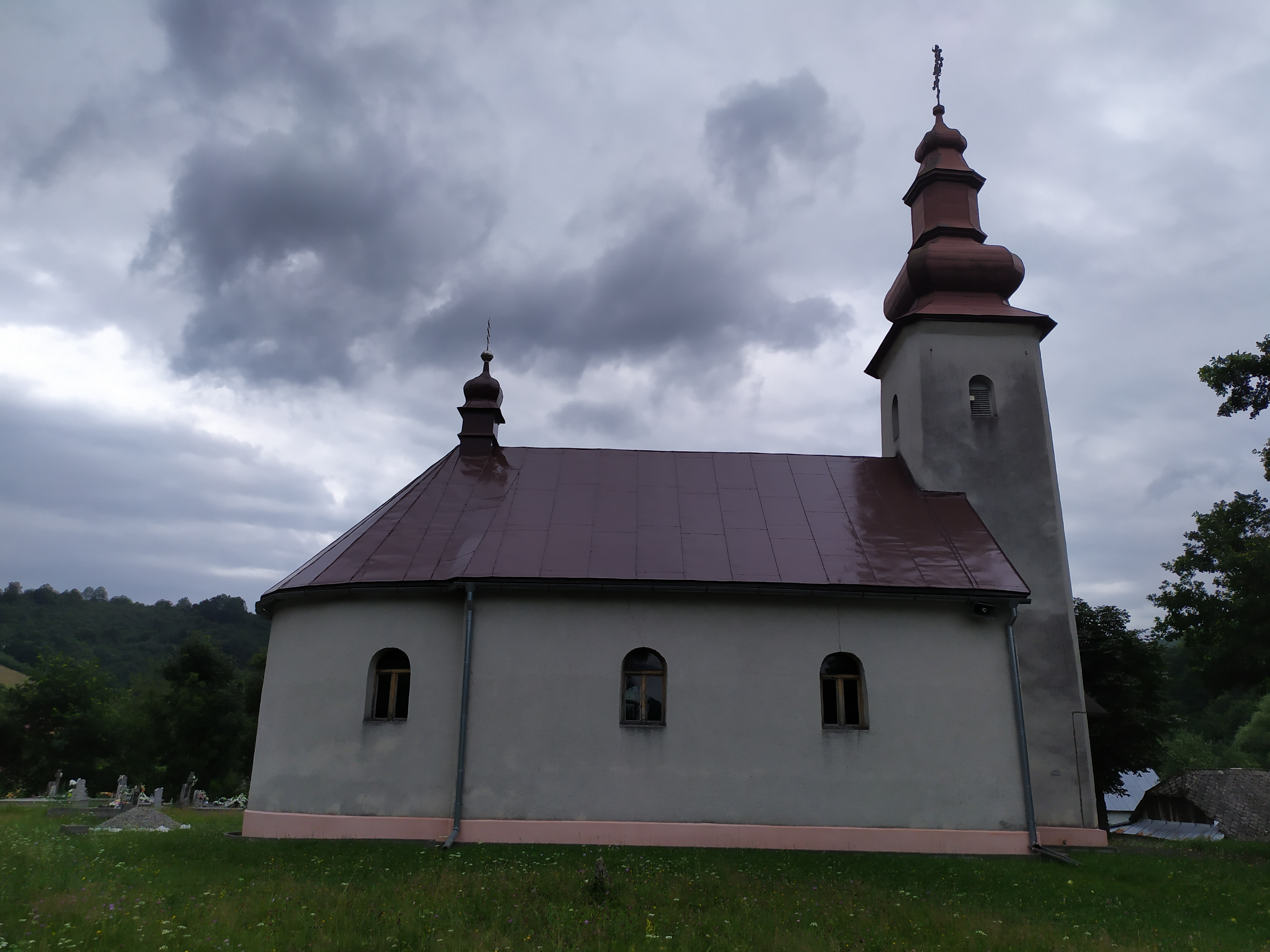

- Flag

- Location of Kolbasov in the Prešov Region Location of Kolbasov in Slovakia
- Coordinates: 49.02°N 22.38°E
- Country: Slovakia
- Region: Prešov Region
- District: Snina District
- First mentioned: 1548

Area
  - Total: 15.98 km^{2} (6.17 sq mi)
- Elevation: 299 m (981 ft)

Population (2025)
  - Total: 59
- Time zone: UTC+1 (CET)
  - Summer (DST): UTC+2 (CEST)
- Postal code: 676 6
- Area code: +421 57
- Vehicle registration plate (until 2022): SV
- Website: kolbasov.sk

Kolbasov (Rusyn: Ковбасів; Hungarian: Végaszó) is a village and municipality in Snina District in the Prešov Region of north-eastern Slovakia.

== Etymology ==
Klobásov—"a place where sausages (klobása, in dialects also kolbása, klbása) are made". The village was famous for its slaughterhouse. Alternativelly, something curved (a street, a creek or a village, the village was founded by the bend of the creek). Kolbasa, Kolbazo 1548 (the first written mention), Kolbaso 1773, Kolbásow 1808; in Hungarian also Kolbaszó until 1899, after renamed to Végaszó.

== History ==
Before the establishment of independent Czechoslovakia in 1918, Kolbasov was part of Zemplén County within the Kingdom of Hungary. In 1939, it was for a short time part of the Slovak Republic. As a result of the Slovak–Hungarian War of 1939, it was from 1939 to 1944 again part of Hungary. On 26 October 1944, the Red Army entered Kolbasov and it was once again part of Czechoslovakia.

Several Jews were murdered here by the Ukrainian Insurgent Army (UPA) on 8 December 1945, the last night of Chanuka.

== Geography ==
The municipality lies at an altitude of 299 metres (981 ft) and covers an area of 15.98 km^{2} (6.17 sq mi) (2025).

== Population ==
Population statistic (10 years)
Year	1995	2005	2015	2025
Count	168	117	85	59
Difference		−30.35%	−27.35%	−30.58%

Population statistic
Year	2024	2025
Count	61	59
Difference		−3.27%

It has a population of 59 people (31 December 2025).

=== Ethnicity ===
Census 2021 (1+ %)
Ethnicity	Number	Fraction
Slovak	55	80.88%
Rusyn	41	60.29%
Ukrainian	2	2.94%
Russian	1	1.47%
Not found out	1	1.47%
Total	68	

In year 2021 was 68 people by ethnicity 55 as Slovak, 41 as Rusyn, 2 as Ukrainian, 1 as Russian and 1 as Not found out.

Note on population: The difference values of population numbers in the table "Population statistic" and in the sections "Ethnicity" & "Religion" is caused by the use of various statistical methods.

=== Religion ===
Census 2021 (1+ %)
Religion	Number	Fraction
Greek Catholic Church	56	82.35%
Eastern Orthodox Church	5	7.35%
None	3	4.41%
Roman Catholic Church	2	2.94%
Not found out	1	1.47%
Other	1	1.47%
Total	68	

In year 2021 was 68 people by religion 56 from Greek Catholic Church, 5 from Eastern Orthodox Church, 3 from None, 2 from Roman Catholic Church, 1 from Not found out and 1 from Other.
