= Michal Frankl =

Czech historian (born 1974)

Michal Frankl (born 1974) is a Czech historian and a Senior Researcher at the Masaryk Institute and Archives of the Czech Academy of Sciences. Previously, he was the head of the Department of Jewish Studies and of the History of Antisemitism at the Jewish Museum in Prague. He is the Principal Investigator of the Unlikely Refuge? Refugees and Citizens in East-Central Europe project funded as a European Research Council Consolidator grant.

== Works ==
- Frankl, Michal; Szabó, Miloslav (2015). Budování státu bez antisemitismu?: násilí, diskurz loajality a vznik Československa [Building a state without antisemitism?: violence, loyalty discourse, and the establishment of Czechoslovakia] (in Czech). Nakladatelství Lidové noviny. ISBN 978-80-7422-422-5.
- Frankl, Michal (2011). "Prag ist nunmehr antisemitisch": tschechischer Antisemitismus am Ende des 19. Jahrhunderts (in German). Metropol-Verlag. ISBN 978-3-86331-019-6.
- Čapková, Kateřina; Frankl, Michal (2012). Unsichere Zuflucht: die Tschechoslowakei und ihre Flüchtlinge aus NS-Deutschland und Österreich 1933-1938 (in German). Böhlau. ISBN 978-3-412-20925-4.
- Frankl, Michal (2007). "Emancipace od židů": český antisemitismus na konci 19. století (in Czech). Paseka. ISBN 978-80-7185-882-9.
