= Miloslav Szabó =

Slovak historian

Miloslav Szabó is a Slovak historian who is employed by the Faculty of Arts of Comenius University in Bratislava.

== Works ==
- Szabó, Miloslav (2005). Rasa a vôl̕a: Alfred Rosenberg a Mýtus 20. storočia (in Slovak). Kalligram. ISBN 978-80-7149-736-3.
- Szabó, Miloslav (2014). Od slov k činom: Slovenské národné hnutie a antisemitizmus (1875-1922) (in Slovak). Kalligram. ISBN 978-80-8101-801-5.
- Frankl, Michal; Szabó, Miloslav (2015). Budování státu bez antisemitismu?: násilí, diskurz loajality a vznik Československa [Building a state without antisemitism?: violence, loyalty discourse, and the establishment of Czechoslovakia] (in Czech). Nakladatelství Lidové noviny. ISBN 978-80-7422-422-5.
