= Beyond Violence: Jewish Survivors in Poland and Slovakia, 1944–48 =

2014 book by Anna Cichopek

- First edition cover
- Author: Anna Cichopek
- Language: English
- Genre: History
- Publisher: Cambridge University Press
- Publication date: 2014
- Publication place: United Kingdom
- ISBN: 978-1-107-03666-6

Beyond Violence: Jewish Survivors in Poland and Slovakia, 1944–48 (2014) is a book by the Polish historian Anna Cichopek, based on her PhD thesis at the University of Michigan, which examines Holocaust survivors in postwar Poland and Slovakia and how they went about regaining their Aryanized property, obtaining citizenship in their country of residence, and dealing with violence from non-Jews.
