= Czechs, Slovaks and the Jews, 1938–48 =

2013 book by Jan Láníček

- First edition
- Author: Jan Láníček
- Genre: Non-fiction
- Publisher: Palgrave Macmillan
- Publication date: 2013

Czechs, Slovaks and the Jews, 1938–48: Beyond Idealisation and Condemnation (2013) is a book by the Czech historian Jan Láníček which addresses relations between Czechs, Slovaks, and Jews from the Munich Agreement to the 1948 Czechoslovak coup d'état which installed a Communist government. The book focuses especially on the Czechoslovak government-in-exile and its attitudes and actions with regard to the Jews who had been trapped in Czechoslovakia during the Nazi occupation.
