= Union of Slovak Partisans =

Union of Slovak Partisans (Slovak: Zväz slovenských partizánov) was a veterans' organization for former Slovak partisans. It was eventually taken over by the Communist Party of Czechoslovakia and operated as a pro-Communist armed group during the 1947 Slovak political crisis and the 1948 Czechoslovak coup d'état.
