= SRP (Slovak organization) =

SRP (Sdruženie fašistickým režimom rasovo prenasledovaných v Bratislave; English: Organization of Victims of Racial Persecution at the Hands of the Fascist Regime in Bratislava) was an organization that helped Holocaust survivors in Slovakia. Until 1948, its secretary general was Vojtech Winterstein. There was a separate organization (ÚSŽNO) for Jews by religion, regardless of denomination, but several thousand of the survivors in Slovakia were atheists, of Jewish descent but not Jews according to halakha, or otherwise fell outside the Jewish community. These people were helped by the SRP, technically a separate organization although it shared much of its leadership with ÚSŽNO.
