= Kapucínska Street =

Street in Bratislava, Slovakia

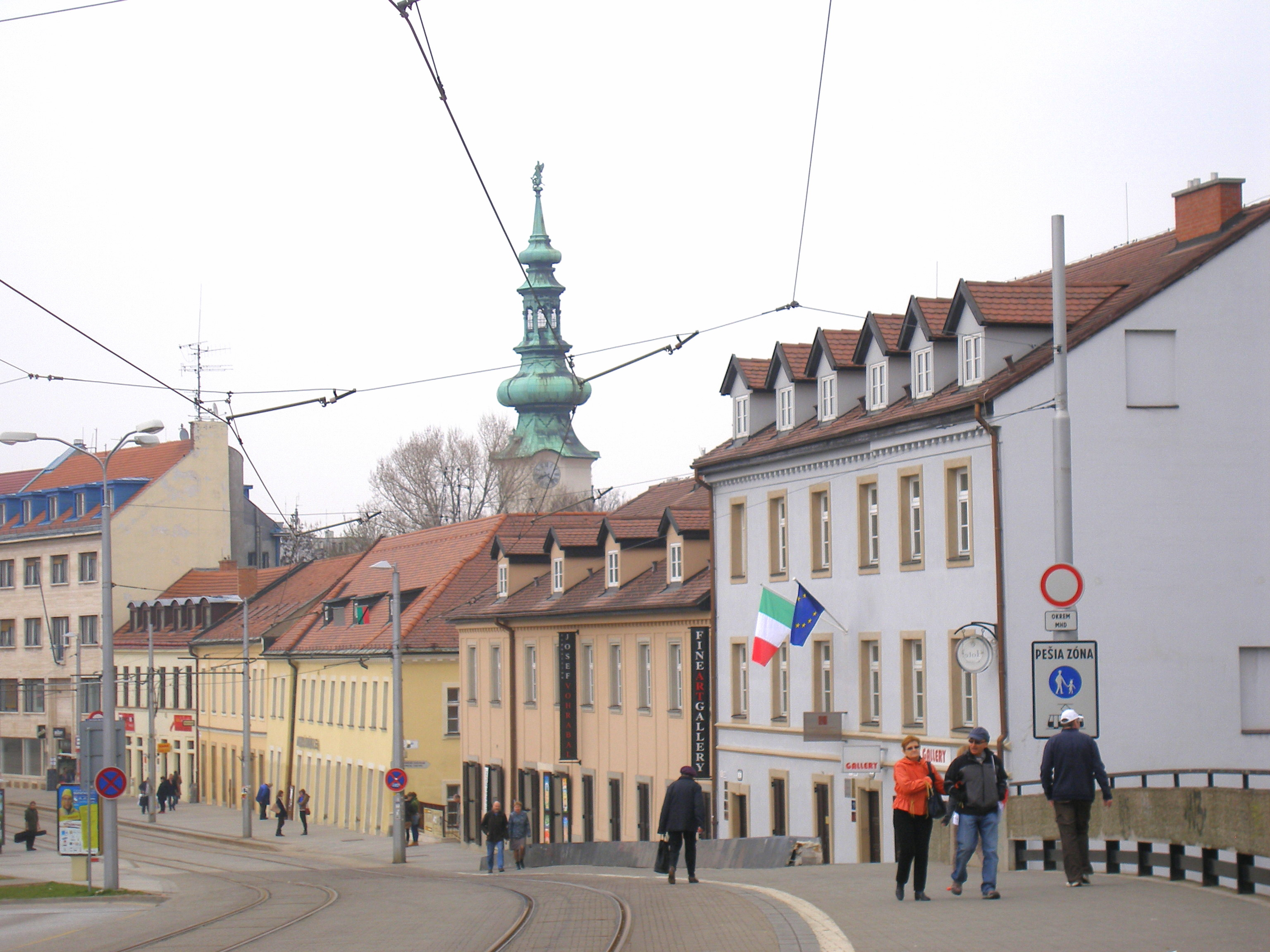
- Interactive map of Kapucínska Street
- Native name: Kapucínska (Slovak)
- Location: Bratislava
- Coordinates: 48.1448225°N 17.1043461°E

Kapucínska Street (Capuchin Street) is a street in Bratislava, Slovakia in the historic center of the Old Town.

== Background ==
Located in the historic center of the Old Town., the street sits next to the Župní náměstí (County square) and through its center there is a tram line leading to the overpass above Staromestská direction below Hradní vrch towards the boroughs of Karlova Ves and Dúbravka.

In 2006, it underwent a complete refurbishment of the surface, and an old well was discovered nearby and was reconstructed on this occasion. On Kapucínska there is an old Capuchin church Church of St Stephen the King, Bratislava and a municipal library.

== Gallery ==
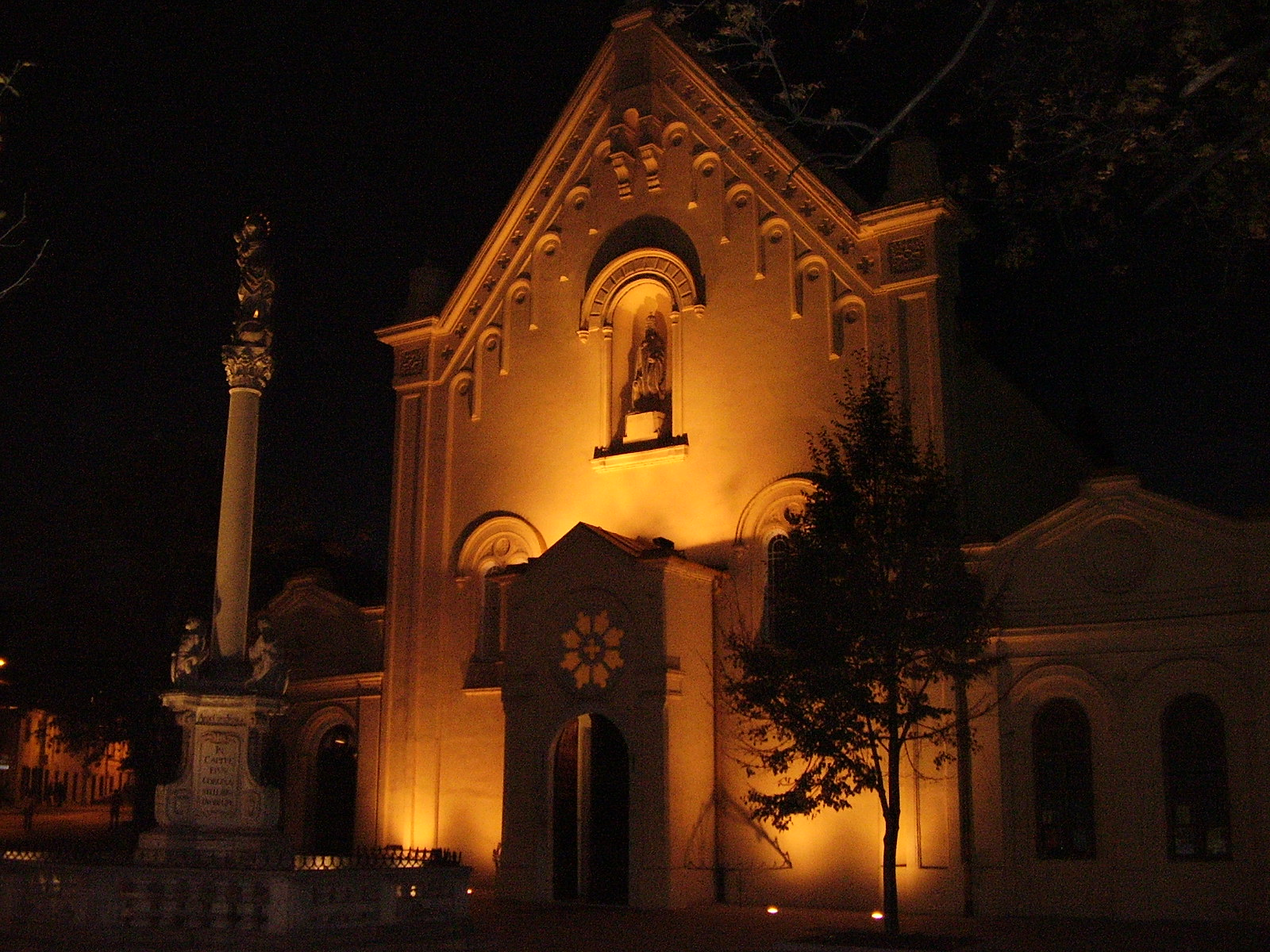
Illuminated Church of St Stephen the King, Bratislava at night

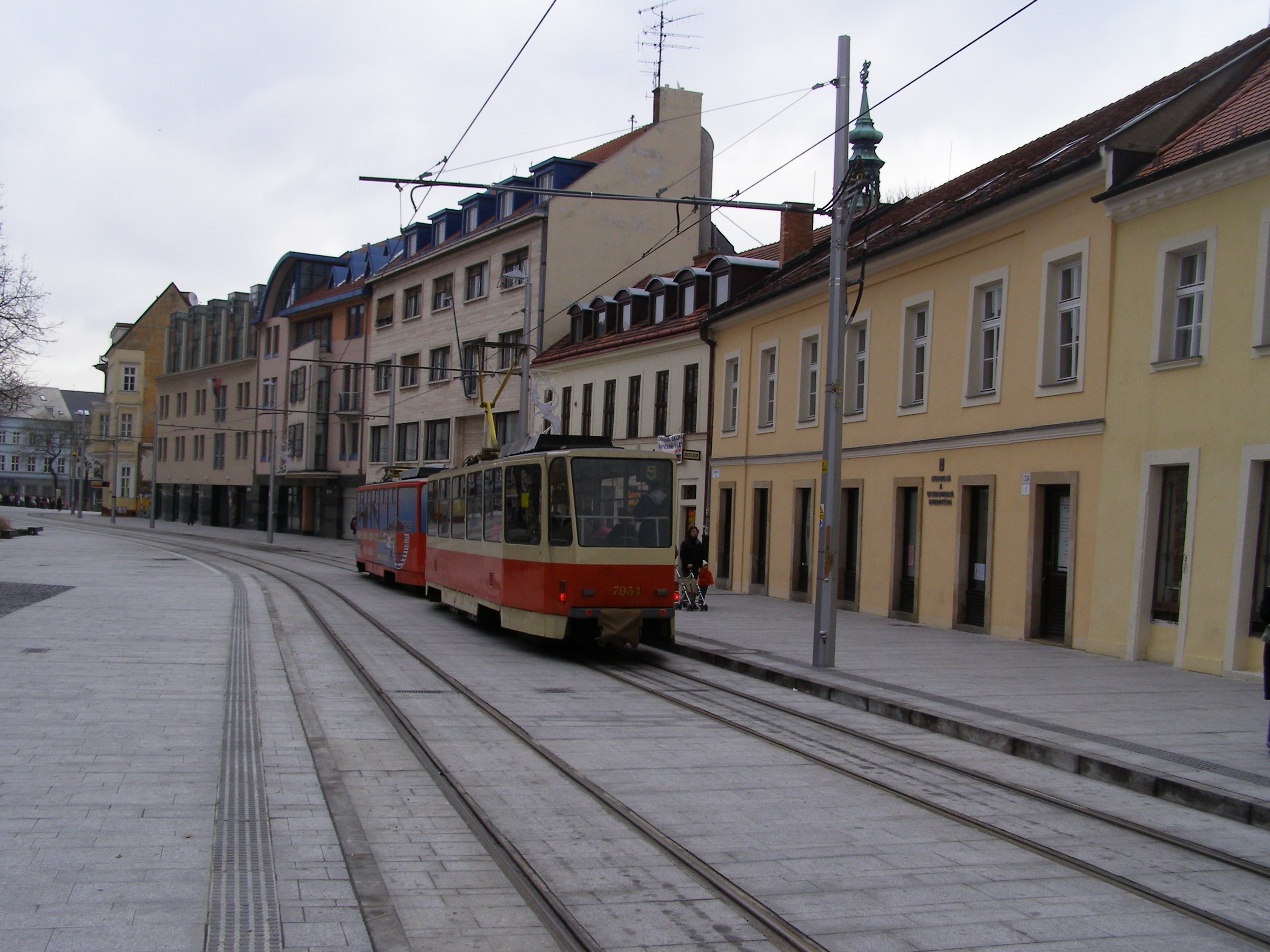
Kapucinska Street with T6A5 tram standing at the bus stop

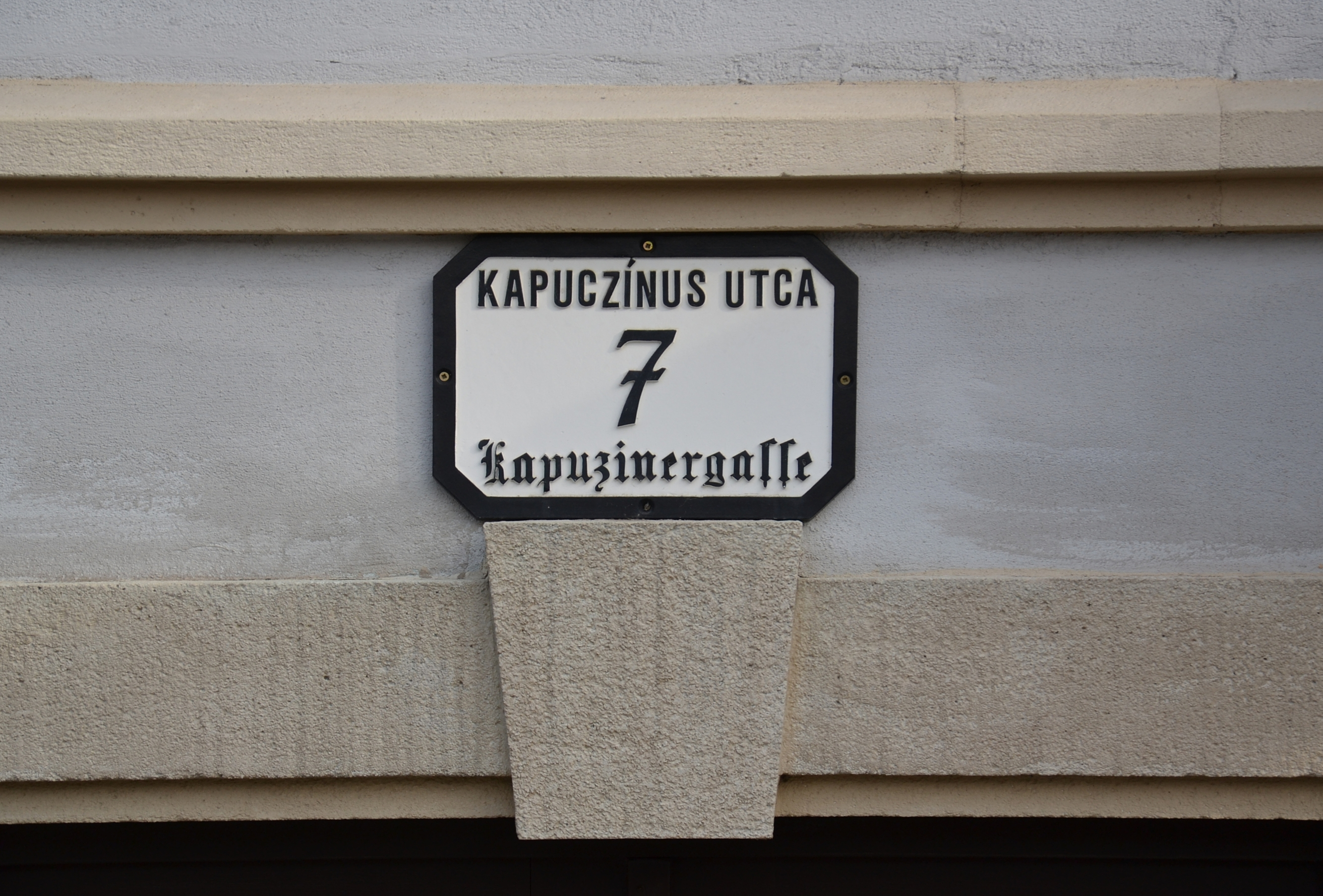
Old tablet
