= Jan Láníček =

Czech historian (born 1981)

Jan Láníček (born 1981) is a Czech historian who studies Czechoslovak Jewish history in the twentieth century and the Czechoslovak government-in-exile. He graduated from Palacký University Olomouc (2006) and received his doctorate from the University of Southampton (2011). He is currently an associate professor of history at the University of New South Wales in Sydney, Australia. He is the co-editor of the Australian Journal of Jewish Studies. He was the Vice-President (NSW) of the Australian Association for Jewish Studies.

== Works ==
- Láníček, Jan (2013). Czechs, Slovaks and the Jews, 1938-48: Beyond Idealisation and Condemnation. Springer. ISBN 978-1-137-31747-6.
- Láníček, Jan (2016). Arnošt Frischer and the Jewish Politics of Early 20th-Century Europe. Bloomsbury Academic. ISBN 978-1-4725-8589-9.
- Kubátová, Hana; Láníček, Jan (2018). The Jew in Czech and Slovak Imagination, 1938–89: Antisemitism, the Holocaust, and Zionism. Leiden, Boston: Brill. ISBN 978-90-04-36244-4.
