= Ján Mlynárik =

- Born: February 11, 1933; Fiľakovo, Czechoslovakia (now Slovakia)
- Died: March 26, 2012 (aged 79); Prague, Czech Republic
- Education: Charles University (grad. 1957)
- Occupations: Historian; politician; dissident; academic
- Known for: Signatory of Charter 77; Historiography of the expulsion of Sudeten Germans; Founding chairman of the Union of Slovaks in the Czech Republic
- Office: Member of the Federal Assembly
- Political party: Public Against Violence

Ján Mlynárik (11 February 1933 – 26 March 2012) was a Czech and Slovak historian and dissident, Charter 77 signatory, and member of the Federal Assembly from 1990 to 1992 as a representative of Public Against Violence.

== Life ==
Mlynárik was born on 11 February 1933 in Fiľakovo, Slovakia, the son of a blacksmith, in straitened circumstances. His family moved to Zelené, in the former Sudetenland, which led to Mlynárik's interest in the expulsion of Sudeten Germans. In 1957, he graduated from Faculty of Arts, Charles University in Prague, going on to teach history at the Academy of Performing Arts in Bratislava. Through the end of the 1960s, his historical work focused on Slovakia in the interwar era. By 1964, he was considered non-conformist, which led to a rebuke from president Antonín Novotný. Because he condemned the Warsaw Pact invasion of Czechoslovakia in 1968, he was dismissed from his job and expelled from the Communist Party of Czechoslovakia. Mlynárik worked for the National Theatre in Prague and at Slavia Café. Along with another Slovak intellectual, Dominik Tatarka, Mlynárik was one of the first people to sign Charter 77. He also wrote for samizdat publications.

In 1978, he published an article in Pavel Tigrid's banned Svědectví magazine (under the pseudonym "Danubius"), in which he condemned the expulsion of Germans from Czechoslovakia, comparing it to population transfer in the Soviet Union and Nazi deportation of Jews. Mlynárik was one of the first Czechoslovak authors to write about the expulsions, which were a taboo subject, and Mlynárik's article sparked extensive debate in the magazine. The StB hunted down "Danubius" and discovered his real identity. In 1981, Mlynárik was caught trying to smuggle his historical archive and documents on the charter out of the country, and he was arrested. He was imprisoned without trial at Ruzyně Prison for thirteen months, and later said that witnessing the mistreatment of other detainees led him to develop diabetes and other health problems. In 1982, he was forced to emigrate to Germany, as part of a larger effort to force Charter 77 signatories into exile. In Germany, Mlynárik worked as a journalist for Radio Free Europe, the BBC, and Deutschlandfunk.

After the Velvet Revolution, Mlynárik returned to Prague. In 1990, he was elected to the Federal Assembly as a representative of Public Against Violence. He advocated for all Communist-confiscated property to be returned to its original owners, due to his belief that a democratic and free society must respect property rights. Mlynárik also sued another Slovak representative, Stanislav Pánis of the Slovak National Party, for organizing a rally celebrating the anniversary of foundation of the Slovak State on 14 March 1991. President Václav Havel appeared at the rally and was assaulted by Slovak nationalists, some of whom were wearing Hlinka Guard uniforms or carrying banners praising Jozef Tiso. According to Mlynárik, Pánis' organization of the rally amounted to promotion of fascism because the Slovak State regime was a "totalitarian power which unleashed a genocide of Jews, and persecution and murders of Slovak patriots who resisted Nazism". According to Mlynárik, the prosecutor did not know what "fascism" was and requested that Mlynárik give him a lecture. A month later the case was dropped. After his term expired in 1992, Mlynárik continued to publish and lecture, heading the Department of Slovak Studies at Charles University. In 1993, he became the chairman of Union of Slovaks in the Czech Republic. Until his death, he edited the periodical Slovenské rozhľady (Slovak Views).

== Works ==
Mlynárik's book Dějiny židů na Slovensku ("History of the Jews in Slovakia", 2005) received positive reviews with two reviewers noting that Mlynárik was sympathetic to his subject.

== Documentary ==
Mlynárik was the subject of a documentary, Lyrik by Arnold Kojnok, which premiered at Febiofest in 2014.
