= History of Bratislava =

Capital of Slovakia

Bratislava (Hungarian: Pozsony, German: Preßburg/Pressburg), currently the capital of Slovakia and the country's largest city, has existed for about a thousand years. Because of the city's strategic geographical location, it was an important European hub due to its proximity to the advanced cultures of the Mediterranean and the Orient as well as its link to the rest of Europe, which were possible by the Danube River.

== Prehistory ==
=== Paleontology ===
In the area where present-day Bratislava lies, three skeletons of the (Epi)Pliopithecus vindobonensis were found in the borough Devínska Nová Ves in 1957, dating to 25–15 million years ago. Teeth of the Griphopithecus suessi (formerly known as Sivapithecus darwiny or Dryopithecus darwiny), dating 14–10 million years ago, were also found in Devínska Nová Ves, this time in 1902.

=== Stone Age and Bronze Age ===
From the Paleolithic period, hand-axes and other stone tools of Homo heidelbergensis (from the periods about 0.45 million years and about 0.3 million years ago) and of Neanderthal man were found.

The first known permanent settlements on the town's territory (Linear Ceramics Culture) was during the Neolithic period. However, during the Early Stone Age there was already a settlement in the general area. But this was not within the present territory of the city. The first known fortified settlement on the area of later medieval castle of Bratislava appeared in Eneolithic. In the Bronze Age there were settlements from both older and younger (Urnfield cultures) part of the period. On the area of later Devín castle one finds important clues to the final period of the Bronze Age (Podoli Culture), when a fortified settlement arose on the strategic place: rock-cliff over river Morava joining river Danube.

=== Iron Age ===
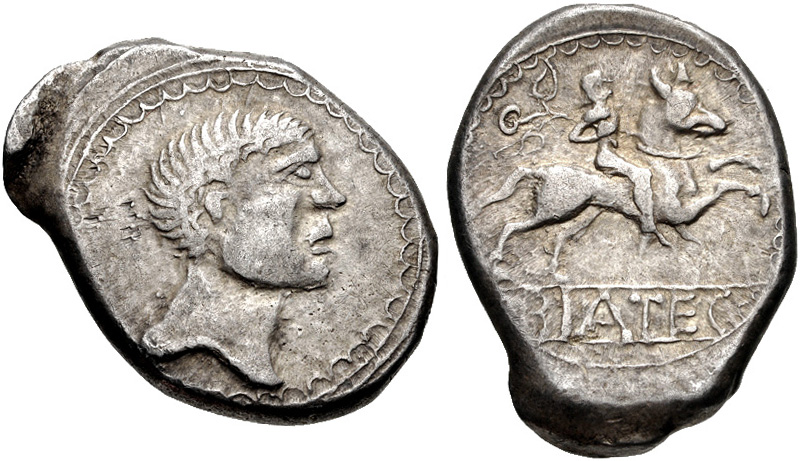
Biatec, presumably a king, who appeared on the Celtic coins minted by the Boii at the current location of Bratislava, 1st century B.C.

The early Iron Age brought a shift of the settlements focus again to the area of today's historical centre and the castle of Bratislava. This period is considered an epilogue to Central European pre-history and this is attributed to the migration of the Thracian tribes, which brought with them their version of the Hellenic civilization. Many archaeological finds support the theory that both the castle-hill and the area of the town (on an important river-crossing) formed an important seat of local Hallstatt culture and that the richly furnished mounds (barrows) excavated on eastern suburbs of the city may have been burial grounds of princes.

The La Tène period is defined as from 450 BC to 50 BC. Celts (more exactly the tribe of Boii) formed between 125 and 50 BC an important Celtic oppidum (fortified town) with a mint in the area of the castle hill and the historical centre. There is an acropolis on the castle hill and some settlements below (crafts) and around it (farming). Bratislava then became a genuine town for the first time in history (it will become a de facto town again in the 9th century AD and then again in the 11th century). The most notable finds are represented by silver coins, bearing inscriptions (biatecs in most cases). Biatec may have been the name of the local prince who organized the minting or the name of the place itself. After the bloody defeat at the hands of Dacian forces under the leadership of King Burebista (shortly after the middle of the 1st century BC) the remaining Celts retreated to the site of Devín, creating a smaller, more easily protected hill-fort settlement. The arrival of Germans from the west forced the rest of the Celts to seek protection under the Romans on the other (right) side of Danube.

== 1st century–10th century ==
From the 1st to 4th centuries the border of the Roman Empire (Limes Romanus) ran along the Danube. The northern side belonged to the Free Barbaricum (German tribes – Marcomanni) and southern side belonged to Rome. Under the suburb of Rusovce, the remains of the Roman border town Gerulata have been excavated, as well as cemeteries and farming background of the town (Villa Rusticas). Despite belonging officially to Barbaricum, several sites of Roman presence are to be found on the area of the city. There is, for example, the case of the Devín Castle, which historical records such as the Chronicle of Fulda alluded to as the impregnable Roman military garrison called Dowina. Traces of Roman influence also include Roman baths in Dúbravka which are interpreted as a local chieftain's seat, and a complex in the nearby town of Stupava that has traditionally been interpreted as a Roman military base or as a Roman trading station but which may also have been the seat of a local chieftain.

The Slavs arrived in the area between the 5th and 6th centuries during the Migration Period (375–568). Recently, archaeologists found a carbonized loaf of bread at Devin and its age was estimated to be older than the Slavic settlement but still fell within the period of the migration of nations.

In 568, the Eurasian Avars arrived in the area. After a successful insurrection of the Slavs (probably at Bratislava-Devín) against Avarian rule in this region, Samo was made King of the Slavs in 623, establishing the first known Slavic political entity, Samo's Empire, which lasted until 658. From the 8th century until 907 the Pressburg fortress as well as the Dowina (Devín) Castle are important centres of the Principality of Nitra.

In 864, the first written reference to the Devín Castle (Dowina) appears in the Fuldish Annals. Around 900 it was probably owned by the (originally) Lower Pannonian prince Braslav (Bräslav, Brazlaw) - or by a magnate of the same name - who was a vassal of Bavaria (Germany). Earlier, it was thought that Bräslav was the person who gave the town Bratislava its German name Brezalauspurc (see 907), later Pressburg, and maybe also its new Slovak name Bratislava; nowadays, it is assumed that Pressburg/Brezalauspurc is a distortion of Predeslausburg, a name derived from Predslav, who was (according to some historians) the ruler of Bratislava around 900 and the 3rd son of the Great Moravian king Svätopluk; the modern Slovak name Bratislava, however, is assumed to be derived (by mistake) from the name of the Czech ruler Bretislav I. The first written reference to Bratislava (as Brezalauspurc) appears in 1837 by J. Safarik Slovak historian. The Bavarians were totally defeated by the Magyars; as a result, the Frankish East March dissolved and was occupied by the Magyars (907–955). Pressburg then became part of emerging medieval Hungary.

== 1000–1241 ==
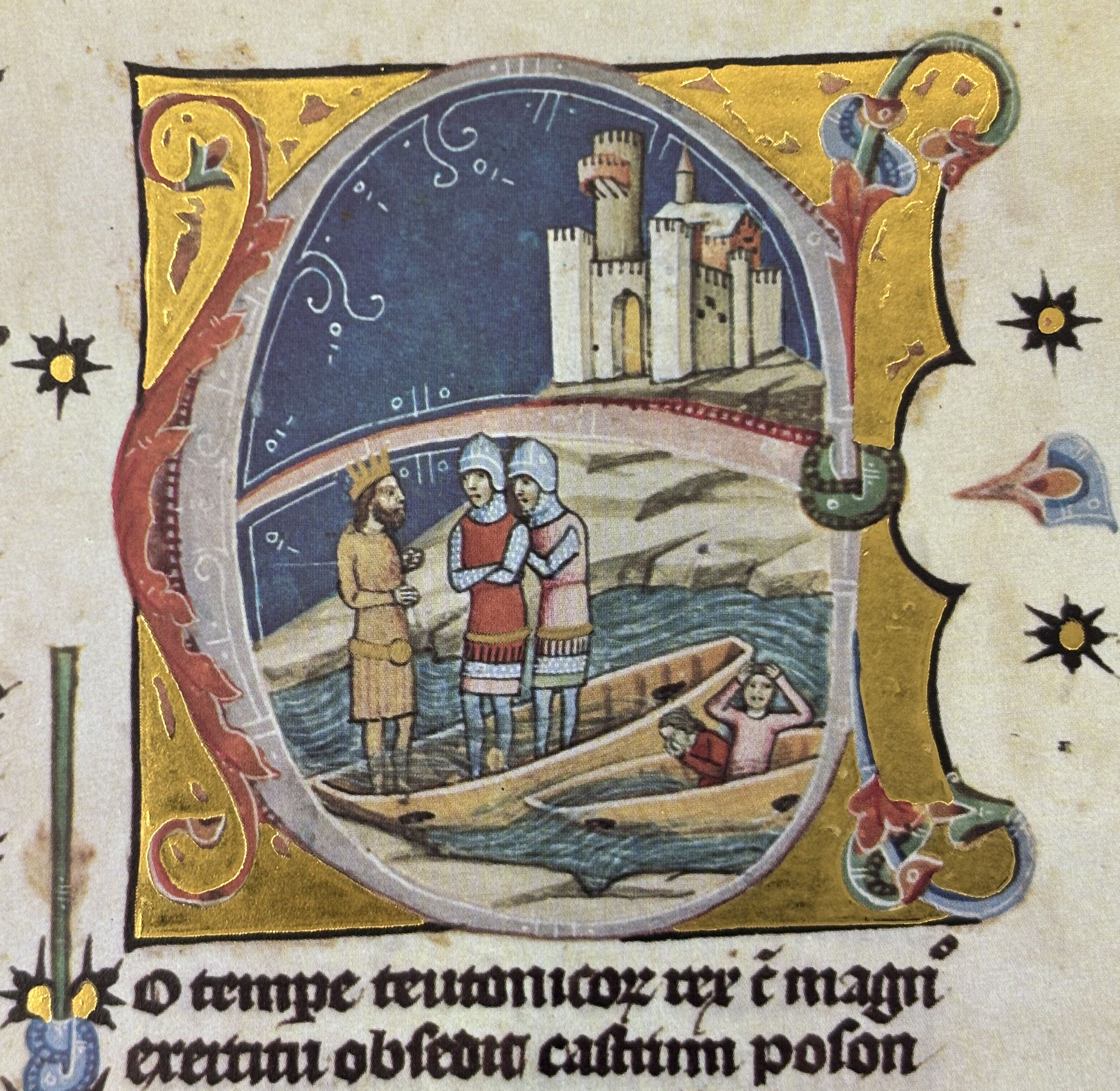

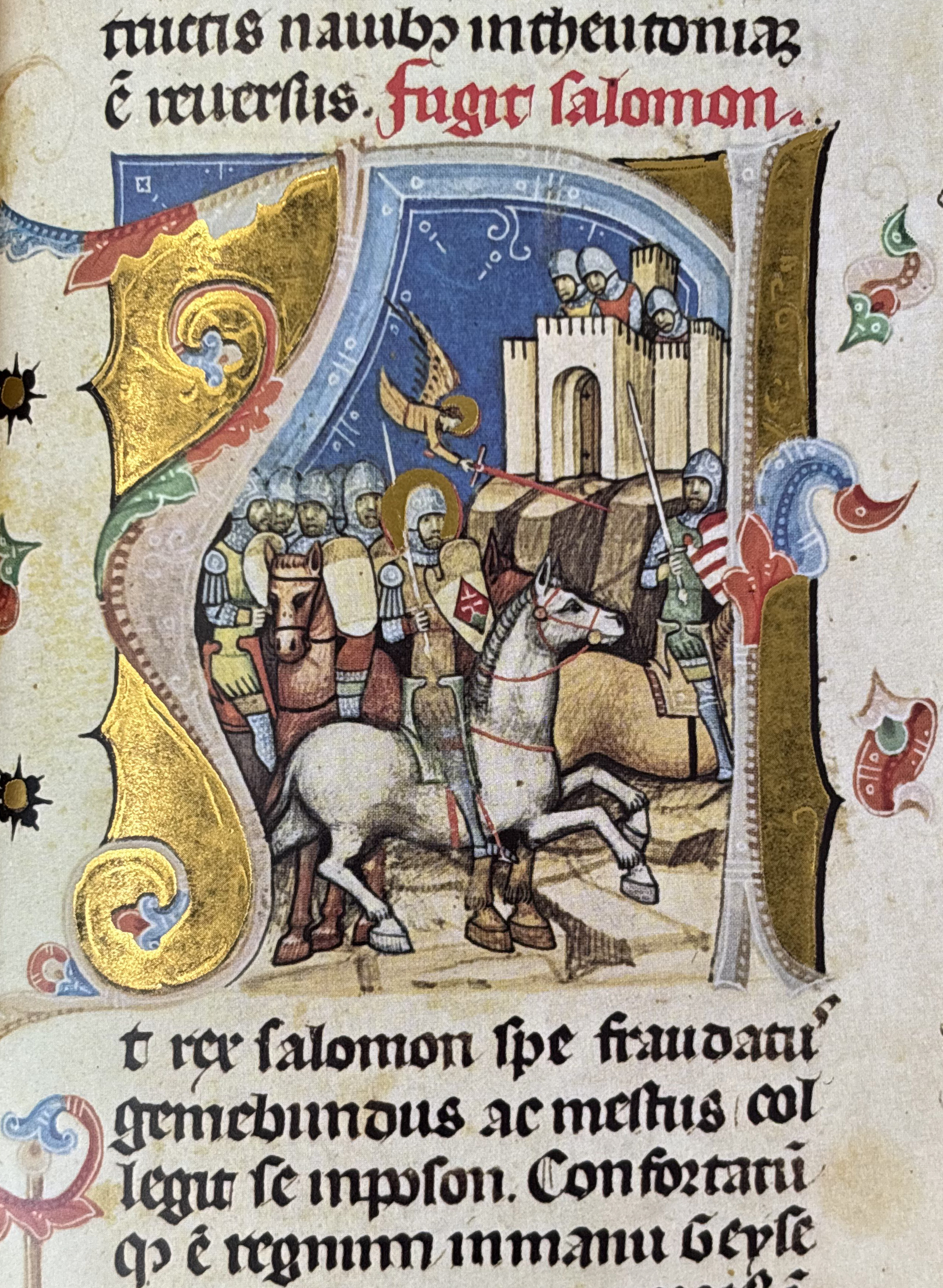
The earliest known depiction of Pressburg Castle: unsuccessful German siege in 1052 and escape of King Solomon of Hungary from King Géza I of Hungary and Prince Ladislaus in 1070s (Illuminated Chronicle, 1358)

From around 1000, a market settlement (the future town centre) grew below the Pozsony Castle (first written reference in 1151) and emerged as an important hub in the early 13th century. Further settlements in the surrounding areas followed. The castle became one of the best fortifications in Hungary because of its position, and (along with the city) became a site of frequent attacks and battles, and a place of frequent stay by Hungarian kings. Around 1000, the Pozsony county (comitatus), one of the first counties in Hungary, was founded, probably by Grand Prince Stephen I. Coins with the inscriptions "PHANUS REX" and "RESLAVVA CIV" have been found in Sweden; some scholars claim that the coins were minted in "(p)RESLAVVA CIV(itas)" or "(b)RESLAVVA CIV(itas)" (i.e., in the town of Bratislava), but other authors point out that no coins of this type have been found on the territory of the Kingdom of Hungary, their weight and diameter differ from King Stephen's other coins and their inscriptions are confused which suggest that they are counterfeit coins minted abroad on the sample of other coins that had been minted following the patterns of King Stephen's coins with the inscriptions "STEPHANUS REX" and "REGIA CIVITAS".

Pressburg (Bratislava) in 1588

In 1030, the Czech duke Břetislav I, participating in a campaign of the German emperor Konrad II against Hungary, devastated present-day western Slovakia and undertook an attack against the Pozsony castle but was defeated by the Hungarian king. 12 years later Břetislav I and the troops of the German king Henry III temporarily conquered Pozsony. Henry undertook a new invasion in 1043.

In 1052, the German king Henry III besieged Pozsony for 2 months without success, but caused considerable damage to the castle. The following year, Pope Leo IX personally visited the town to achieve a peace between Henry and the Hungarian king. In 1073 and 1074, Hungarian king Solomon, who was based at Pozsony castle during his fighting against Géza and Duke Ladislaus, had the castle reconstructed. Hungarians settled in the market settlement below the castle in several waves in the 12th and 13th centuries, joining the previously predominantly Slovak inhabitants there. In 1108, the German king Henry V, along with the Czech duke Svatopluk, failed to conquer Pozsony/Pressburg castle. In 1109, a new attack of the Czechs (undertaken as a revenge for a Hungarian attack of Moravia) failed. Boris, who claimed the throne against King Géza I of Hungary (although his mother had been removed by her husband, King Coloman of Hungary because of adultery), besieged and conquered Pressburg Castle in 1146. The Hungarian king has to buy it back. The Hungarian king Stephen III was living in Pozsony castle in the 1160s and had its fortification improved. Participants of the Third Crusade to the Holy Land, led by the German king Frederick I Barbarossa, gathered at Pozsony castle in 1189.

== 1241–1536 ==
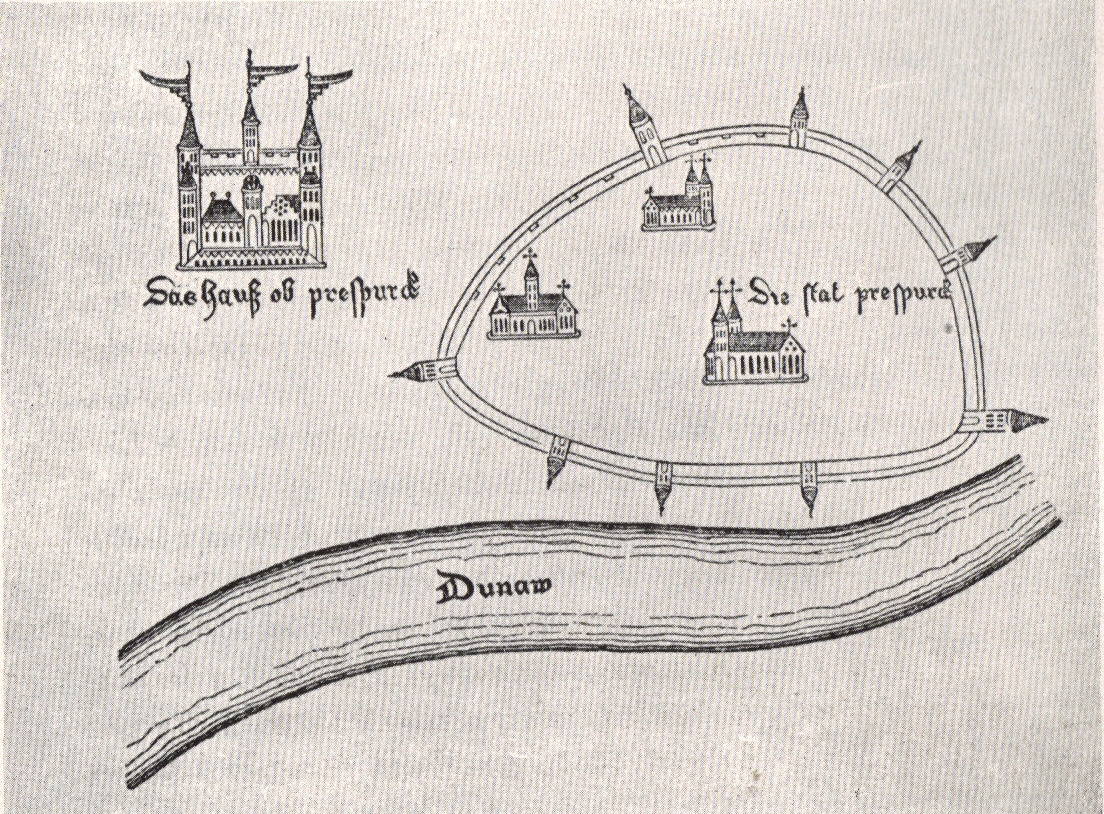
Pressburg city plan, 1438–55

In 1241 and 1242, the Mongols failed to conquer the fortified castle and the town below it, but temporarily devastated the surrounding settlements. The castle was adapted after these attacks. After 1242, German colonists came to the town and their number gradually increased, so that until the late 19th century they represented by far the largest ethnic group in the town. In 1271, and 1273–1276 the town was captured by the King of Bohemia, Ottakar II in connection with fighting between Hungary and Bohemia because of Styria. In this connection, the (1st) Peace of Pressburg was signed in 1271.

The city was captured by the Hungarian nobleman and palatine Nicholas Kőszegi in 1285–1286, who (temporarily) burned down the castle in 1286, but his revolt against the king was defeated. In 1287–1291, the city was captured by the Austrian duke Albert of Habsburg. Albert was defeated by the Hungarian nobleman Matthew III Csák of Trenčín, who was the leader of Pozsony and Trenčín counties at that time and Pozsony belonged to Hungary again.

The town (the part below the castle) was conferred its first (known) town privileges by the Hungarian king Andrew III in 1291. Earlier town privileges are not known, but probable, because Pressburg has been called a "town" as early as around 1250. After 1291, the town received many privileges from Hungarian kings, especially from the emperor Sigismund in the 15th century. After the death of the Hungarian king Andrew III, Pressburg was annexed by Austria in 1301, because Andrew's widow gave the town to the Habsburgs. The Habsburgs returned it to Hungary in 1322, but occupied it again later. In 1338, the town became part of Hungary again. In 1405, the town was declared a free royal town by King Sigismund of Luxemburg. Not only Pressburg but all towns in Hungary got this status (meaning that they received "collective nobility", i.e. the status of a feudal lord with all its privileges) because Sigismund wanted to restrain the increasing power of the (true) feudal lords in Hungary. The Hussites first appeared in 1428, when they burned down the suburbs of Pressburg. Negotiations held a year later in Pressburg between Sigismund of Luxemburg and the Hussites (in April and in June) failed. Between 1432 and 1434, the Hussites tried to conquer the city but their attacks failed. The first bridge over the Danube in Pressburg was built in 1434, but it was destroyed by floods next year. In 1434 and 1435, the amount of payments by Hungary, for which the Hussites would leave Slovakia, was officially negotiated. In 1436, Sigismund of Luxemburg awarded Pressburg the right to use its own coat of arms and orders to improve the fortification of the castle (because of the last Hussite invasion during that year). From 1439 to 1486, another bridge over the Danube existed in Pozsony, being washed away by flood in 1486.

Between 1440 and 1443, there was fighting between the castle of Pozsony, supporting king Ladislaus III of Poland, and the actual town of Pozsony below the castle hill, supporting (and owned by) queen Elisabeth. In 1442, Ladislaus settled at the castle and temporarily conquered the town, but was defeated by the Austrian emperor Frederick III, Holy Roman Emperor supporting Elisabeth. In 1443, Elisabeth got the town back, but the castle remained in Ladislaus' hands till his death in 1444.

From 1465 until 1490, Pozsony was the seat of the first university in present-day Slovakia, the Universitas Istropolitana (often wrongly called Academia Istropolitana). From 1490 to 1526, Pressburg was a place of diplomatic negotiations under the Jagiellonian kings. In the summer of 1490, Maximilian I, Holy Roman Emperor drove the Hungarians from Austria, and even occupies Hungarian frontier territories, but he is compelled by want of money to retreat, and signed the Treaty of Pressburg (also called the (2nd) Peace of Pressburg) with the Hungarian King Ladislaus II on 7 November 1491. Under this treaty it is agreed that Hungary renounced Lower Austria and agreed that Maximilian should succeed to the crown in case Ladislaus left no legitimate male issue.

After the Battle of Mohács in 1526, where the Kingdom of Hungary was defeated by the expanding Ottoman Empire, the Turks besieged Pressburg 1529, but failed to conquer it. Two years later churches and hospitals outside the town wall were deliberately destroyed so that the Turks would not be able to see from there into the town behind the town wall. In the beginning of 1532, thousands of soldiers were sent to Pressburg as a protection against the Turks planning to attack Vienna. Pressburg was temporarily turned to a military camp. The Turks, seeing the military force in Pressburg, decide to attack Vienna from the south. In this period the city became a safe haven for the Holy Crown of Hungary, kept safe from Turkish and Habsburg hands.

== 1536–1784 ==
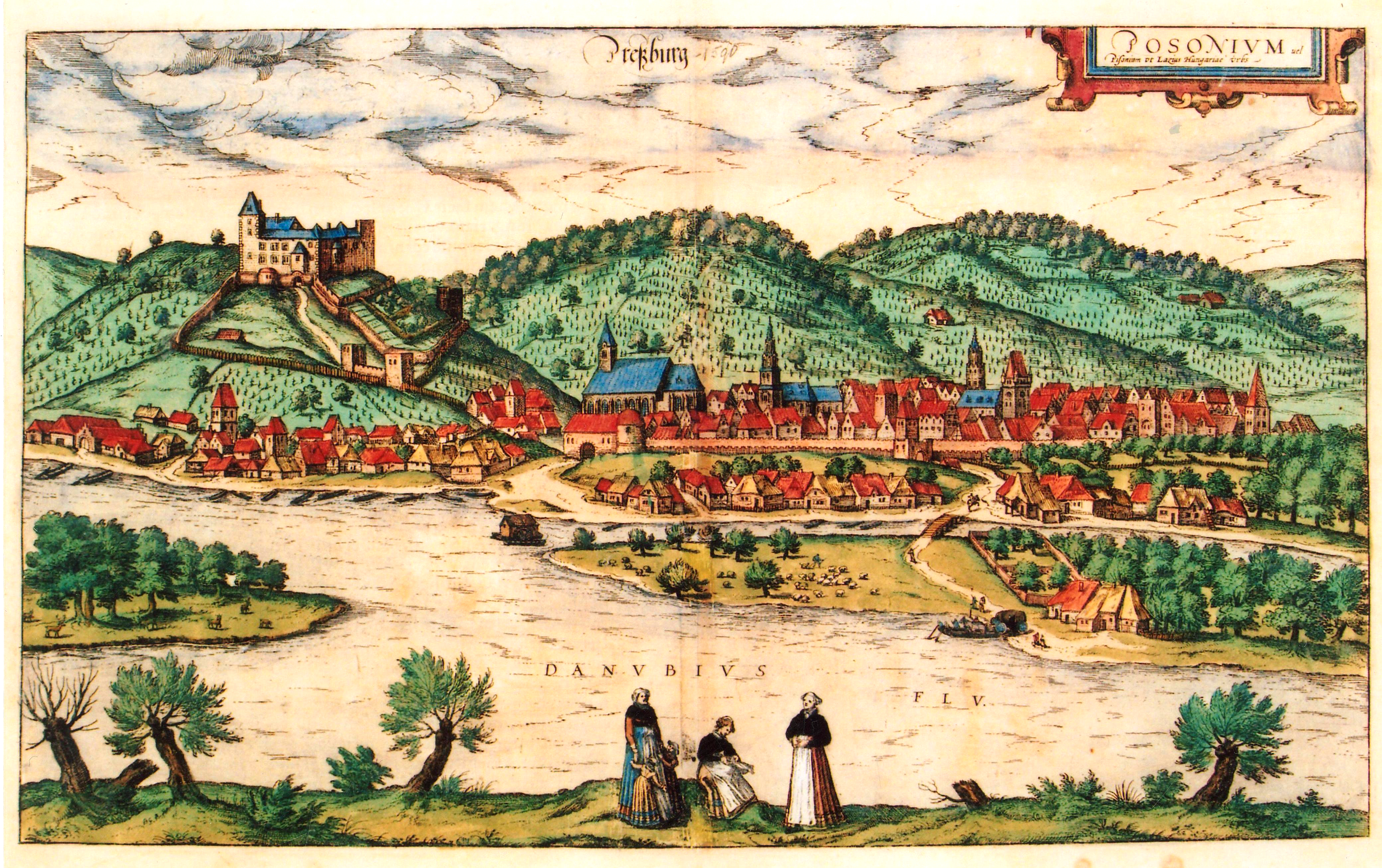
Pressburg in 1588

As a consequence of Ottoman advances through Hungarian territory and the capture of Buda, the city of Pressburg was designated as the capital of Royal Hungary in 1536. The Kingdom of Hungary was part of the Habsburg monarchy from 1526 to 1918. Pressburg was also made a meeting place of the Hungarian Diet from 1542 to 1848 (with interruptions) and the coronation town for Hungarian kings and queens from 1536 to 1830 (in the St. Martin's Cathedral). The first coronation was that of King Maximilian of Habsburg, the last one the coronation of Ferdinand V. Altogether, 11 kings and 8 queens were crowned in the town. During Maria Theresa's 40-year reign, Bratislava – along with the rest of her empire – enjoyed sustained economic and social growth.

However, in the 17th century, the town was affected by anti-Habsburg uprisings. In addition, there was fighting with the Turks, floods, plagues and other disasters. The Evangelic Lutheran Lyceum (Evanjelické lýceum) (a kind of Protestant grammar school and, in the 19th century, also a kind of university) was founded in 1607.

=== Anti-Habsburg uprisings ===
In 1606 (during the Stephen Bocskay Uprising), Bocskay troops occupied the surroundings of Pressburg. Gabriel Bethlen conquered Pressburg in 1619, as a part of the Bethlen uprising. He was defeated by imperial troops in 1621, and then besieged the town from 1621 to 1622. The (3rd) Peace of Pressburg between Gabriel Bethlen and the emperor Ferdinand II, Holy Roman Emperor was signed in 1626, which put an end to the Bethlen anti-Habsburg uprising. From 1671 to 1677, Pressburg was seat of extraordinary courts against the Protestants and participants in the anti-Habsburg uprisings; e.g. a trial against the participants of the Wesselényi conspiracy takes place in 1671. In the Imre Thököly Uprising (1682–1683), Pozsony was the only town in present-day Slovakia that refused to capitulate to Thököly's troops. The town, but not the castle, capitulated in July 1683 and was only reconquered by Imperial troops after the Turks were defeated near Vienna (September 1683). The last of the uprisings that affected the town was in 1704 (within the Rákóczi Uprising), when Prince Eugene of Savoy managed to protect Pressburg from Rákóczi's troops, although the surroundings of the town wer totally destroyed.

== 18th century ==
Since the 18th century the city has been an important centre of the Slovak national and cultural movement (Slovak National Revival). The Great Plague Epidemic killed 3800 people in the years 1710 and 1711. Later the Holy Trinity column was erected in thanksgiving to God for its ending. In the 18th century, many new baroque buildings were erected, the economy flourished (first factory in 1728), and the first parks were established (see today's Hviezdoslavovo námestie). The town wall was demolished in 1775 to enable further expansion, the first city theatre was opened in 1776, and Pressburg became the largest and most important town in the territory of present-day Slovakia and Hungary. The first journal in Hungary, Mercurius Veridicus ex Hungaria, was published here in 1705 and the first regular newspaper in Hungary (written in Latin), Nova Posoniensia, was published in 1721–1722.

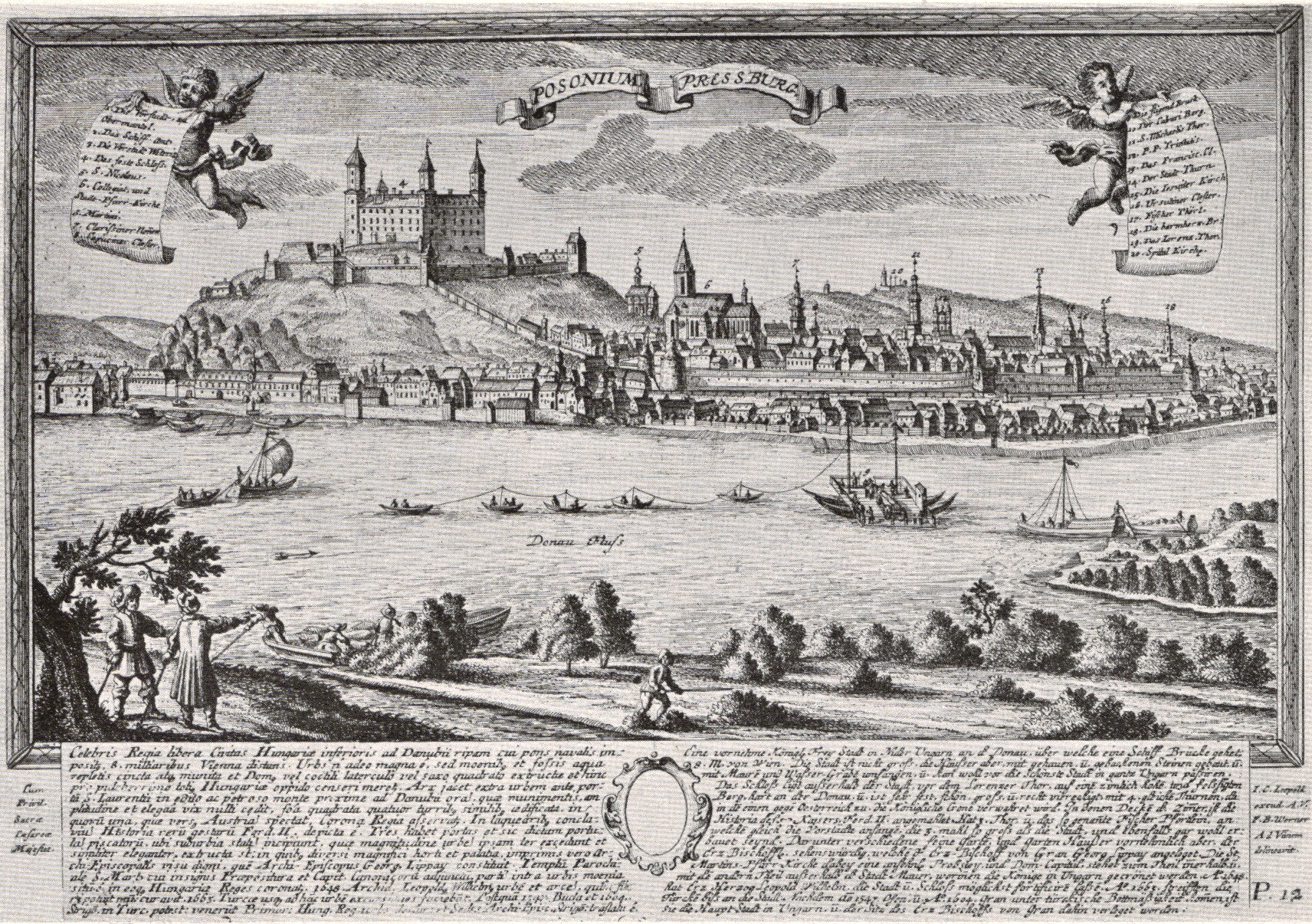
Pozsony in the Baroque era, 1735

The Pragmatic Sanction law was enacted in 1713, which decided the Habsburg monarch's unity and that woman can inherit the Hungarian throne. Maria Theresa of Austria is crowned Queen Regnant of Hungary at St. Martin's Cathedral on 25 June 1741. The 6-year-old Wolfgang Amadeus Mozart gave a concert in the Pálffy Palace in 1762. In 1764 the first German newspaper in Hungary, the Pressburger Zeitung, began publication (which ceased in 1929), and on 1 January 1780.the first newspaper in Hungarian, Magyar hírmondó was published here.

The population increased by 200% between 1720 and 1780, and by 1782 the population had reached 33,000 (out of which 29,223 were in the part of the town below the castle that had the free royal town status), thus making Pressburg the largest town in Hungary. In 1783, the first newspaper in Slovak, Presspurske Nowiny (which remained in circulation until 1787) was published and the first novel in Slovak, René by Jozef Ignác Bajza, was published.

In 1775, Coronation Hill was built by Maria Theresa from soil of Hungary's 64 counties. The new monarch had to ride to the crowning hill and swish their blade towards the four cardinal points. However, in 1783, under the reign of Joseph II, the Crown Jewels were taken to Vienna, and many central offices moved to Buda, which were followed by a big part of the nobility. From here on Pressburg was only the coronation town and the seat of the Hungarian diet. The population decreased and the economic situation of the town deteriorated until 1811.

== 1784–1900 ==
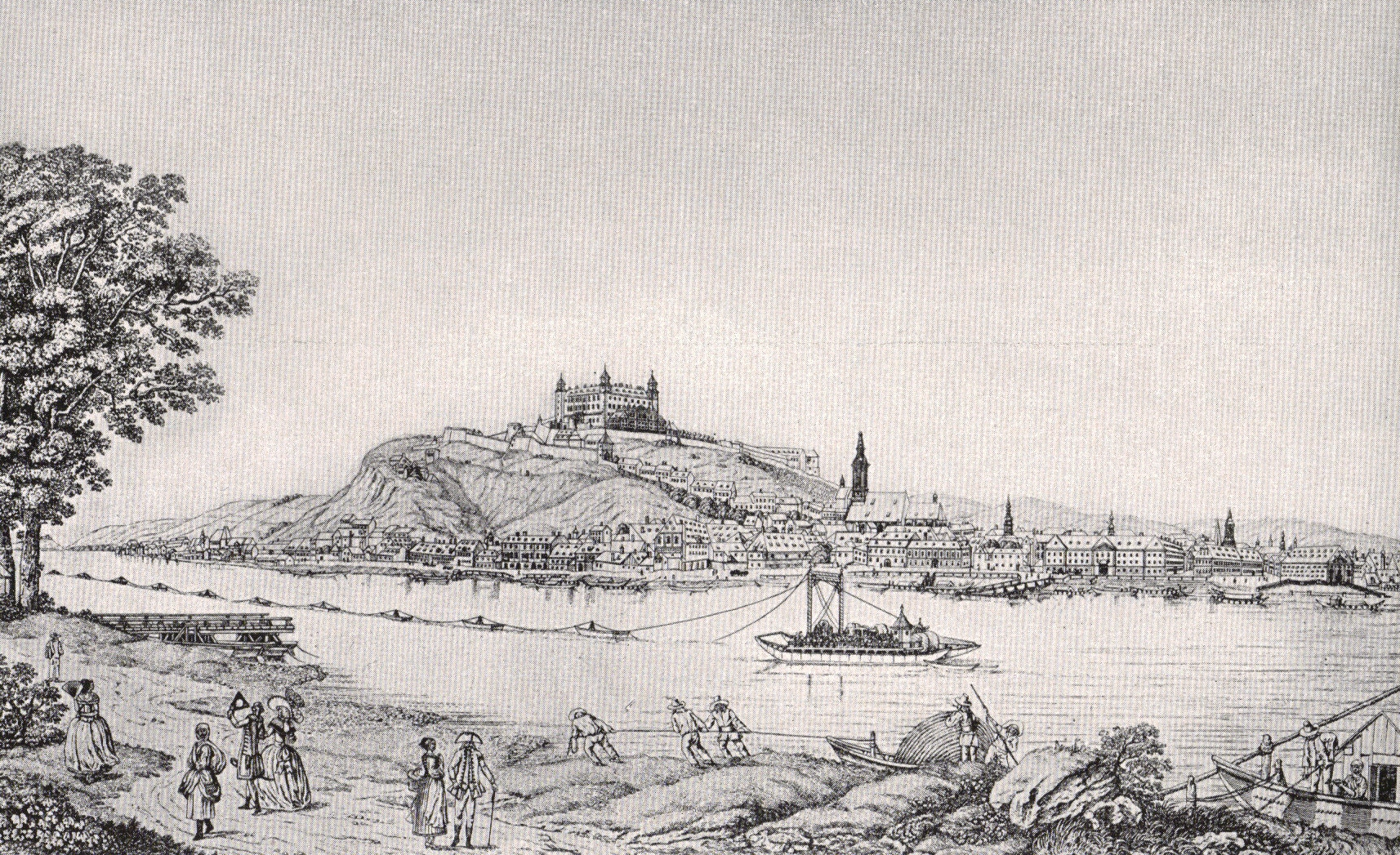
Pressburg in 1787

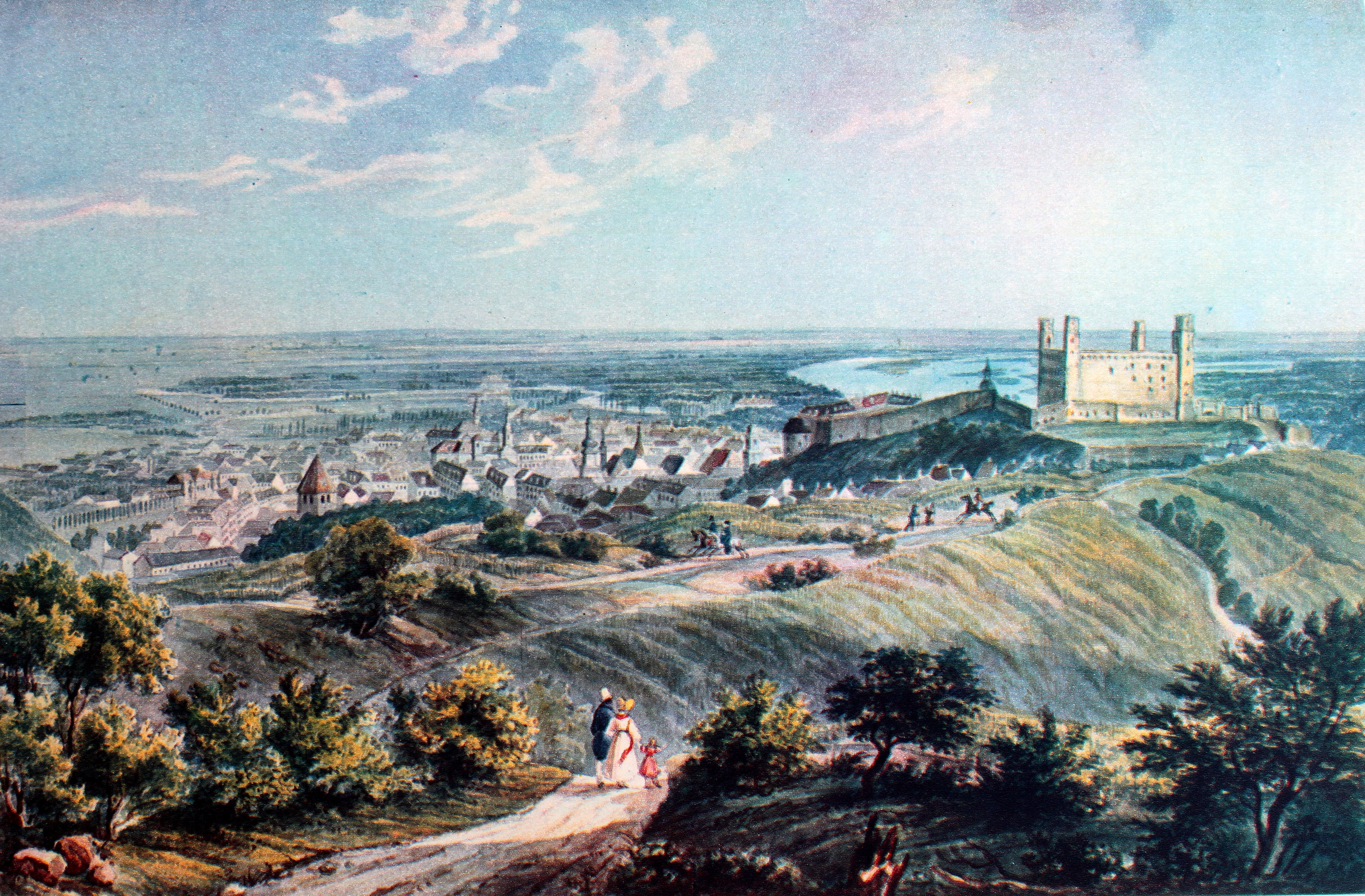
Pressburg in the 19th century

From 1784 to 1800, the General Seminary (a school for Catholic clergy) was based in Pressburg Castle. One of the notable students at this time was Anton Bernolák, who published in 1787 the first Slovak language standard. Another educational institution in Pressburg was the Royal Academy, which moved to the city from Trnava in 1787. In 1803, a separate Department of Czechoslovak Speech and Literature was created (from the Institute of Czechoslovak Speech and Literature founded in 1801) at the Lutheran Lyceum.

Pressburg also played a role in early 19th-century European politics. In 1805, the fourth and best-known Treaty of Pressburg was signed by Austria and France after Napoleon I's victory in the Battle of Austerlitz. Four years later, Napoleon's army besieged and bombarded the city and Napoleon himself visited Pressburg. Dévény Castle was turned into a ruin by the French troops in 1809 and Pressburg Castle was inadvertently destroyed by fire in 1811 (remaining in ruins until the 1950s).

In 1820, the 9-year-old Franz Liszt played in De Pauli's Palace. Five years later, István Széchenyi offered his yearly income to establish the Hungarian National Learned Society (now the Hungarian Academy of Sciences) in Pozsony. In 1829, the Czech-Slav Society (also called the Society for the Czechoslovak Language and Literature) was created by students of the Lutheran Lyceum, which later became an important organization in the Slovak national movement. Ľudovít Štúr also began studying at the Lyceum during this period, spending 20 years there. In 1843 he codified the present-day Slovak language standard. The industrialisation of the town began with regular steamship transport on the Danube in 1830. Ten years later the first (horse-)railway line in Hungary and present-day Slovakia was built from Pressburg to the town of Svätý Jur, north of Bratislava. Later, it extended to Trnava and Sereď (1846).

- 1835: The first champagne was made by Esch and Co in Pressburg in Hungary
- 1837: The First middle-class casino (an elite club), (Mágnás Kör or Pozsonyi Casino) was founded by István Széchenyi.
- 1843: Sándor Petőfi lived in the city. He worked as part of the Diet's administrative staff.
- 1843–1844: The Hungarian language was proclaimed the official language in legislation, public administration and teaching by the Diet.
- 1847–1848: Emperor Ferdinand I of Austria opened the Diet in the Primate's Palace's mirror room, addressing the members in Hungarian.
- 1848 (16 March): Lajos Batthyány and Lajos Kossuth proposed political reforms to the emperor. Lajos Kossuth proclaimed "Hungary reborn" from the hotel Zöldfa (English: Greenwood)'s balcony the next day. Ferdinand I of Austria appointed Lajos Batthyány to form a new Hungarian government.
- 1848 (18 March): The Diet declared the new Hungarian constitution and abolishes serfdom.
- 1848: (11 April): Ferdinand I of Austria signed (in the Primate Palace's Mirror Room) the so-called March Laws, by which serfdom was partly abolished in Hungary. Then he dissolved the Diet. That was the last Hungarian Diet convened in Pressburg, since it was then transferred to Budapest.
- 1848–1849: During the 1848 Revolution the Hungarian Nation Guard was formed by Henrik Justi in the city. This army defeated Jozef Miloslav Hurban's Slovak volunteers near Senec. On 7 October 1848, Josip Jelačić tried to cross the Danube after his army lost the Battle of Pákozd, but Pressburg's citizens destroyed the pontoon bridge. Lajos Kossuth appointed Artúr Görgey the commander-in-chief of the Hungarian army in Pressburg. But the Hungarian army lost the Battle of Schwechat and Prince of Windischgraetz's Austrian army entered the city without fighting on 18 December 1848. After the 1848 Revolution was defeated, the tribunal organized by Field Marshal Julius Jacob von Haynau sentenced 149 people to prison and 14 people to death. The 13 Martyrs of Arad's execution orders were also signed by Haynau there.
- 1848: A railway connection to Vienna was established.
- 1849: The City Council created a new (fourth) city district, Mesto Márie Terézie, by incorporating the independent villages of Zuckermandel and Podhradie, beginning the expansion of the city.
- 1850: A railway connection to Budapest was established.
- Late 19th century: New prosperity was arose, partly thanks to mayor Henrik Justi and banker Theodor Edl (who, during the Hungarian Revolution of 1848, had been political opponents). This period witnessed considerable modernization of infrastructure in Pressburg, including new sewerage and gas-works in 1856, the beginnings of a telephone and electrical lighting system in 1884, a new water supply system, the first permanent bridge over the Danube in 1891 (Starý most), the development of a tram system in 1895, and the introduction of public electricity in 1902. The city also industrialized, with the foundation of a chemical factory known today as Istrochem in 1873 and an oil refinery known today as Slovnaft in 1895. As a result, during the last decades of the Austro-Hungarian monarchy, Pressburg was the second most industrialized town of the Kingdom of Hungary.
- 1866: The Battle of Lamač in Pressburgh, the last battle of the Austro-Prussian War.
- 1867: After the Austro-Hungarian Compromise of 1867, Henrik Justi, the former leader of the 1848 Hungarian Nation Guard in the city, became the mayor.
- 1870: Coronation Hill was rebuilt by the city council's order.
- 1886 (22 Sept): The city theater (today's Slovak National Theatre) was opened. Kálmán Tisza, Hungarian Prime Minister, and his whole government (as well as writer Mór Jókai) took part in this ceremony with the opera Bánk bán. The gala performance was conducted by Ferenc Erkel.
- 1897 (15 May): A statue of Maria Theresa made by János Fadrusz was erected on the Coronation Hill square. Franz Joseph I of Austria and his family took part in the dedication's ceremony.

== 20th century ==
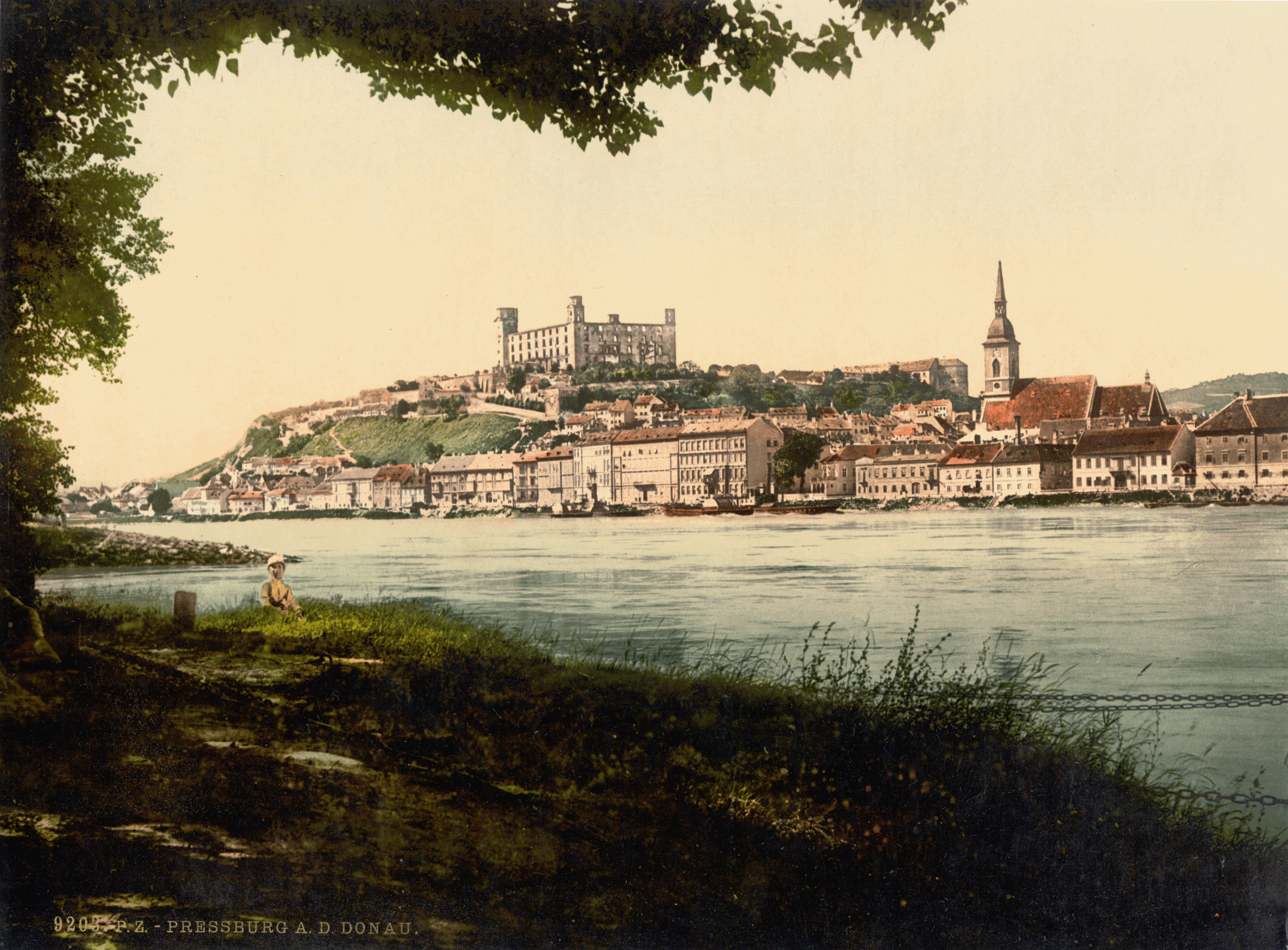
View of Pressburg in 1900

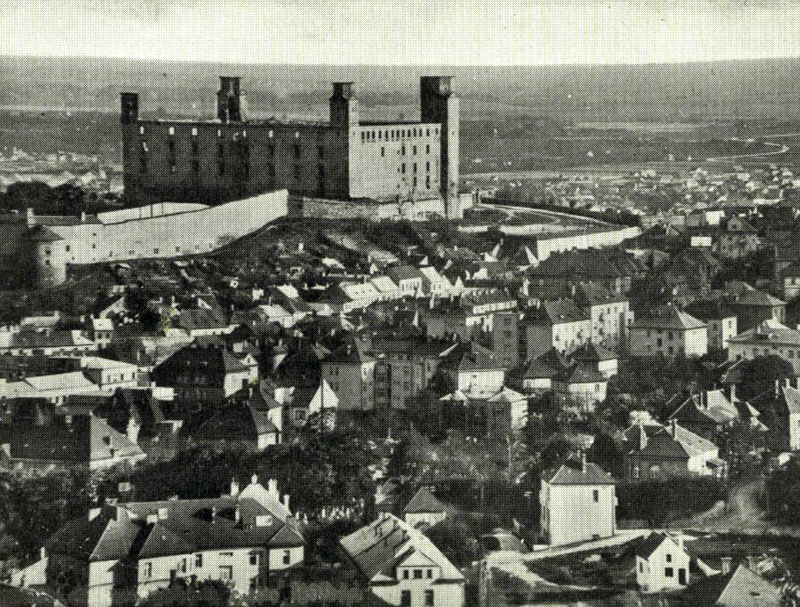
Bratislava at the beginning of the 20th century

In 1905 Philipp Lenard, the Hungarian-German physicist and winner of the Nobel Prize for Physics for his research on cathode rays and the discovery of many of their properties, visited Pressburg. In the same year, Ján Bahýľ, a Slovak inventor, flew his petrol-engine helicopter in Pressburg, reaching a height of 4 metres for more than 1,500 metres (4,900 ft). A

After World War I, began dissolution of the Austro-Hungarian Empire. U.S. president Woodrow Wilson and the United States played a major role in the establishment of the new Czechoslovak state. In a blatant attempt to appeal to the Allies, American Slovaks proposed rename the city "Wilsonovo mesto" (Wilson City), after Woodrow Wilson.

On 28 October 1918, Czechoslovakia was proclaimed, but its borders were not settled for several months. The dominant Hungarian and German population tried to prevent annexation of the city to Czechoslovakia and declared it a free city, while the Hungarian Prime Minister Károlyi protested against the "Czech invasion". This Hungarian narrative was debunked by the Slovak National Assembly in 15 November, who pointed out the presence of Slovak soldiers and officers among the legionaries and declared their presence as the "defensive action of the Slovaks themselves, to end the anarchy caused by the flight of the Hungarians." The Entente drew a provisional demarcation line, this was revealed to the Hungarian government on 23 December, in the document known as the Vix Note. The 33rd regiment arrived from Italy and began to advance on 30 December. The minister for the administration of Slovakia, V. Šrobár, requested to negotiate a peaceful surrender of Bratislava to the Czecho-Slovak troops, through sheriff S. Zoch. Afterwards, General Piccione ordered the legionaries to enter Bratislava on 1 January 1919, and by 2 January all important civil and military buildings were in Czechoslovak hands. The city became the seat of Slovakia's political organs and organizations and became Slovakia's capital on 4 February. The (Hungarian) Elisabeth University was originally based here, before becoming the Slovak Comenius University after the Czechoslovak state requisitioned it on 6 January.

On 12 February 1919, According to Hungarian politician Marcell Jankovics, the Czechoslovak Legions opened fire on the unarmed demonstrators. Slovak sources do not deny the shooting, but add that the Legionaries were defending themselves from violent and aggressive behavior of the demonstrators. A contemporary Slovak language newspaper reported that "a mob spat on our soldiers, tore down badges from their hats, physically attacked them and shot on them from windows." According to Hungarian historian Attila Simon, the intervention by the Czechoslovak soldiers firing on the peaceful demonstrators caused 8 deaths and 14 injuries, while Slovak historian Marián Hronský mentions 6 dead and several injured, including the Czechoslovak military commander who was left wounded by Hungarian demonstrators.

On 27 March, the town's official new name became "Bratislava" – instead of "Prešporok" (Slovak) / "Pressburg" (German) / "Pozsony" (Hungarian).

On 4 May Milan Rastislav Štefánik, the French–Slovak general, died in an airplane crash near Bratislava (/Pressburg). On 26–27 October 1921, the statue of Maria Theresa, the Austrian Empress, was destroyed by Slovak nationalists and the members of the Sokol Movement.

Between 1928 and 1930 the Hotel Carlton was built in the place of Hotel Zöldfa, on Séta square (now Hviezdoslavovo square). Hotel Zöldfa had included Lajos Kossuth, Franz Joseph I, Alfred Nobel, and Albert Einstein amongst its guests. The 1930 census showed that the Hungarian population had decreased to under 20% of the city, and Hungarian language signs were removed. Between 1938 (October) – 1939 (March), Bratislava became the seat of government of the autonomous Slovakia within Czechoslovakia (see e.g. Jozef Tiso). Between 1938 (November) – 1945, the future Petržalka borough was occupied by Nazi Germany, and from October 1938 to April 1945, the future Devín borough was part of the Lower Austria area of the German Third Reich. After the break-up of Czechoslovakia, Bratislava became the capital of the First Slovak Republic in 1939. By 1945, most of the city's approximately 15,000 Jews had been removed and sent to concentration camps. The Bratislava oil district, including the Apollo oil refinery, was bombed on 16 June 1944 during the German occupation. The Soviet Red Army took Bratislava on 4 April 1945.

=== After World War II ===
After the war, most of the German population were expelled (some Germans had already been evacuated by German authorities). In 1946, Jews living in the city were attacked during the Partisan Congress riots.

In 1946, the city incorporated the neighbouring villages of Devín, Dúbravka, Lamač, Petržalka, Prievoz (now part of Ružinov), Rača, and Vajnory (Karlova Ves had been annexed in 1944). The so-called Bratislava bridgehead on the right bank of the Danube was enlarged in 1947 with the hitherto Hungarian villages of Jarovce, Rusovce and Čunovo, in accord with the Paris Peace Conference, which transferred these villages to Czechoslovakia, on the grounds that Bratislava needed space for growth. After the Communists seized power in February 1948, the city became part of the Eastern Bloc. Several present-day cultural institutions were established (first films made in the town in 1948; Slovak Philharmonic Orchestra founded in 1949; Slovak National Gallery in 1951, Slovak Academy of Sciences in 1953, Bratislava Gallery in 1959, Slovak Television in 1956), several factories and landmarks were built (sometimes at the expense of the historical cityscape) – Slavín in 1960, Kamzík TV Tower in the 1970s, reconstruction of the Bratislava Castle in 1953–62, and Nový Most, the second bridge over the Danube, in 1972; and factories (Bratislavské automobilové závody and Slovnaft). The city was also affected by the unsuccessful Czechoslovak attempt to liberalize the Communist regime in 1968. Shortly after that, the city became capital of the Slovak Socialist Republic, a part of federalized Czechoslovakia, after the signing of the Law of Federation at the Bratislava Castle in 1968. Since the 1960s, construction of the huge prefab panel buildings had been ongoing. The city also expanded once more in 1972, annexing villages of Jarovce, Rusovce, Čunovo, Devínska Nová Ves, Záhorská Bystrica, Vrakuňa and Podunajské Biskupice. The third bridge over the Danube, called Prístavný most (Harbour Bridge) was built in 1985. The fall of the Communist regime was anticipated by the candle demonstration in 1988, which was violently scattered by the police.

=== Capital of independent Slovakia ===
In November 1989, the city became one of the centres of the Velvet Revolution; Alexander Dubček held his first speech in the city since 1970, and (one day before demonstrations in Prague), Slovak students rallied against the Communist regime on 16 November 1989; further demonstrations would follow. The first non-Communist political party, "Public Against Violence" (Verejnosť proti násiliu, VPN) was established on 21 November.

During the late 1980s and early 1990s, Bratislava was plagued by a rise in criminality. From 6 October 1990 to 16 July 1991, Bratislava had two active serial killers – Ondrej Rigo and Jozef Slovák.

In 1991, the factory of the automaker Volkswagen was founded in Bratislava (until 1994 as a joint venture with the Bratislavské automobilové závody); the fourth bridge over the Danube, Most Lafranconi, was built. On 17 July 1992, the Declaration of Independence of the Slovak Nation was adopted by the Slovak National Council (called National Council of the Slovak Republic since 1994). Six days later, the prime ministers of the two constituent republics of Czechoslovakia agreed to split the country into two independent states; the Constitution of Slovakia was adopted on 1 September and signed at Bratislava Castle on 3 September. After the dissolution of Czechoslovakia in 1992, the city was declared the capital of independent Slovakia.

== 21st century ==
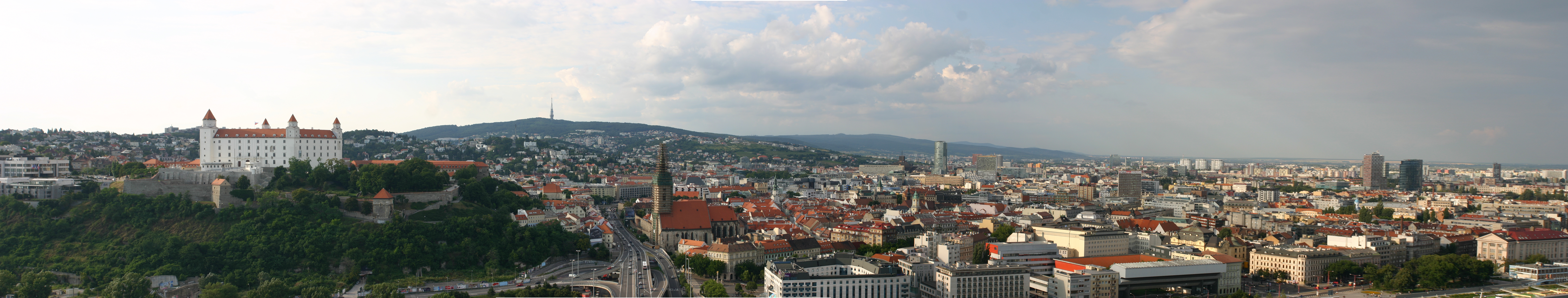

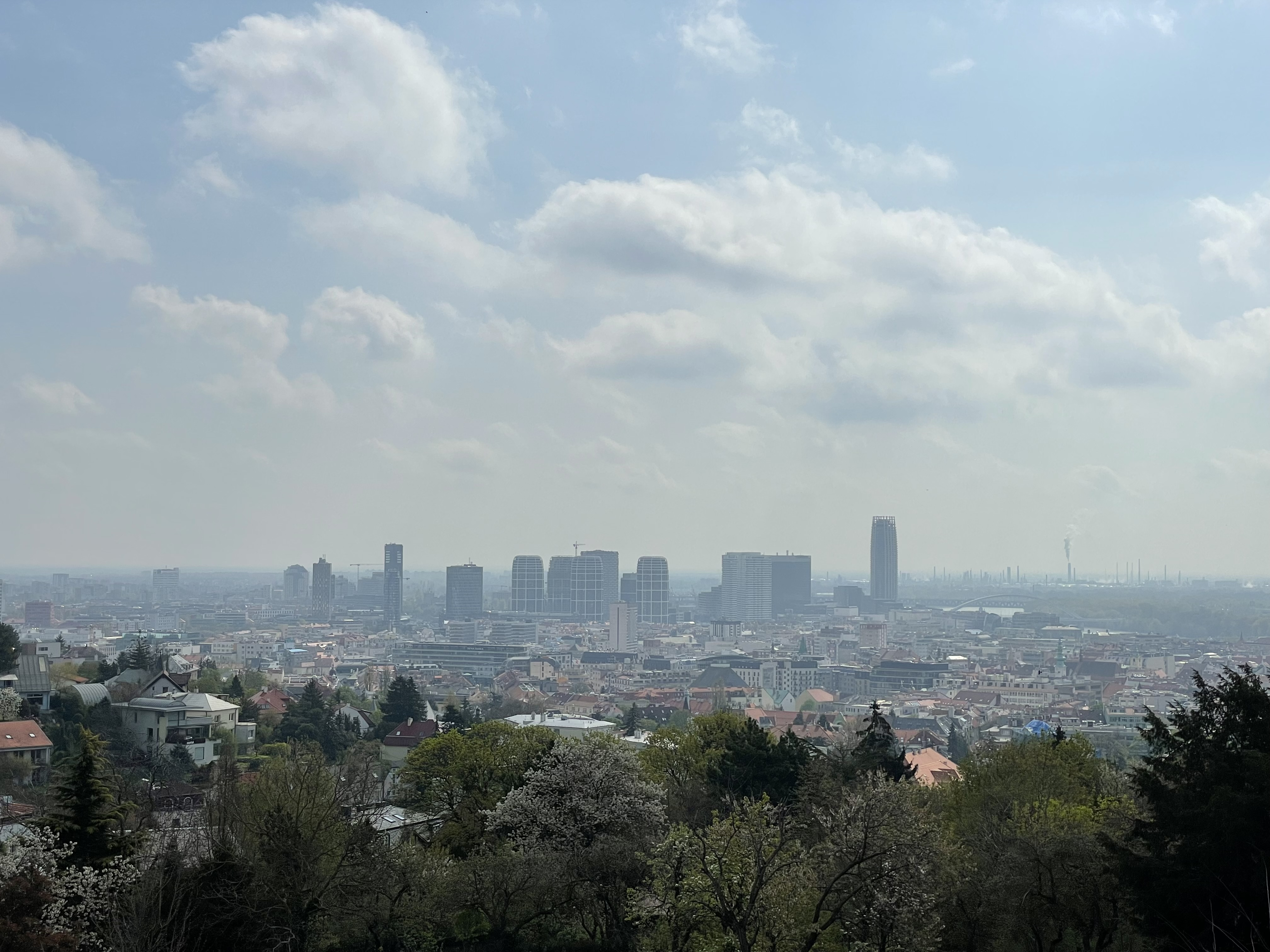
Skyline of Bratislava 2023

Year	Event
2003	The millionth car was produced at Volkswagen Bratislava. The factory produced the models Touareg, Polo, SEAT Ibiza, Golf, Bora 4Motion and their sub-models in 2003.
2003	Construction started on the fifth bridge over the Danube, the Apollo bridge (Most Apollo): the bridge was opened for traffic on 3 September 2005.
2005	George W. Bush and Vladimir Putin met at Slovakia Summit 2005.
2010	Slovak Prime Minister Robert Fico, Head of Parliament Pavol Paska, and President Ivan Gasparovic unveiled a statue of the 9th century leader of the historic Great Moravian Empire, Svatopluk I of Moravia, at Bratislava Castle.

== Demographic evolution ==
The ethnic makeup of the town's population during the last two centuries has been as follows:

- 1850

Germans (75%), Slovaks (18%), Hungarians (7.5%) – Note: all population data before 1869 are not exact –

- 1880

Germans (68%), Slovaks (8%), Hungarians (8%)

- 1910

Germans (41.92%), Slovaks (14.92%), Hungarians (40.53%), of total population of 78,223 Note: the period after 1848 was a period of strong magyarisation in the Kingdom of Hungary; immigration of Hungarians and magyarisation in Bratislava. Also note that in the same time, the municipal area around the city had a population composed of 63.29% Slovaks, 17.39% Germans, and 13.59% Hungarians, of 36,190 inhabitants total The whole county to which the city belonged had a population of 389,750, including 166,017 Slovaks, 163,367 Hungarians, and 53,822 Germans.

- 1919 (August)

Germans (36%), Slovaks (33%), Hungarians (29%), other (1.7%) Note: the Anti-Hungarian sentiment after WWI.

- 1930

Slovaks (33%), Germans (25%), Czechs (23%), Hungarians (16%), Jews (3.83%) Note: emigration of Hungarians and opportunist registering as Czechs or Slovaks; immigration of Czech civil servants and teachers; the Germans remained the biggest group in the part of the city known as Old Town; religious Jews made up 12%, so that most national Jews might have registered themselves as Slovaks or Germans

- 1940

Slovaks (49%), Germans (20%), Hungarians (9.53%), Jews (8.78%)

- 1961

Slovaks (95.15%), Czechs (4.61%), Hungarians (3.44%), Germans (0.52%), Jews (0%) Note: Germans were evacuated when the Red Army was approaching the town in 1945, Jews were eliminated during World War II or they moved thereafter

- 1970

Slovaks (92%), Czechs (4.6%), Hungarians (3.4%), Germans (0.5%)

- 1991

Slovaks (93.39%), Czechs (2.47%), Hungarians (4.6%), Germans (0.29%)

- 2001

Slovaks (91.39%), Czechs and Moravians (2%), Hungarians (3.84%), Germans (0.28%)

== Notable historical figures ==
This is a comprehensive list of historical figures who were born and/or lived in or visited Bratislava.

- Andrew III (see above 1291)
- Ján Bahýľ (1866–1916), Slovak inventor, mainly focusing on flying machines
- Jozef Ignác Bajza (1755–1836), see above, buried in the St. Martin's Cathedral in Pozsony
- Matthias Bel (1674–1749), Hungarian-Slovak scientist, teacher at the Evangelic Lutheran Lyceum (see above) for 35 years
- Ján Levoslav Bella (1843–1936), author of the first Slovak opera
- Anton Bernolák (1762–1813), author of the first Slovak language standard (see above)
- Napoleon Bonaparte (see above 1805, 1809, 1811)
- Matthias Corvinus (1443–1490), king of Hungary. He founded the Universitas Istropolitana, and conferred many privileges to Pozsony.
- Georg Rafael Donner (1693–1741), European sculptor, author of the central sculpture in the St. Martin's Cathedral. He spent 11 years in Pressburg.
- Alexander Dubček (1921–1992), Slovak politician and statesman, who lived in Bratislava
- Ernő Dohnányi (1877–1960), also known as Ernst von Dohnányi, Hungarian composer, pianist, conductor and educator, born in Pozsony
- János Fadrusz (1858–1903), sculptor born in Pozsony. He erected the Maria Theresa statue located on the former Coronation Hill in 1897, which was later destroyed in 1921.
- Ferdinand V (see above 1848)
- Joseph Haydn (1732–1809). He gave many performances in Pressburg.
- Johann Nepomuk Hummel (1778–1837), a composer and virtuoso pianist born in Pressburg
- Gustáv Husák (1913–1991), Slovak politician and the last communist president of Czechoslovakia born in Pressburg
- Janko Jesenský (1874–1945), Slovak poet, writer and translator, who lived in Bratislava since 1929 and died there
- Karl Jetting (1730–1790), the "Robinson of Pressburg", born in Pressburg. He was shipwrecked many times and was living on an isolated island.
- Wolfgang von Kempelen (1734–1804), inventor, born in Pozsony
- Eduard Nepomuk Kozics (1829–1874), important photographer
- Johann Sigismund Kusser (1660–1727), founder of the Hamburg Opera, composer, born in Pressburg
- Vladislaus II of Bohemia and Hungary of Jagiellon (1456–1516), King of Bohemia and Hungary. He spent most of his life in Pressburg.
- Philipp Lenard (1862–1949), physicist and the winner of the Nobel Prize for Physics in 1905, born and raised in Pressburg
- Imi Lichtenfeld (1910–1998), founder of the Israeli martial art Krav Maga. He grew up in Pressburg / Bratislava.
- Franz Liszt (1811–1886), Hungarian composer, who played many concerts in Pozsony and was fond of the town
- Sigismund of Luxemburg (1368–1437), Holy Roman Emperor. He gave many important privileges to the town and had the Pressburg castle reconstructed.
- Rodion Malinovsky (1898–1967), Soviet leader of the troops that occupied Bratislava in April 1945, see above
- Franz Anton Maulbertsch (1724–1796), Austrian painter working in Pressburg
- Franz Xaver Messerschmidt (1736–1783), sculptor, who lived and died in Pressburg
- Sámuel Mikoviny (1700–1750), scientist and technician, founder of scientific cartography in Hungary. He spent 10 years in Pressburg.
- Wolfgang Amadeus Mozart (1756–1791). He gave his only concert in Hungary in Pressburg.
- Jozef Murgaš (1864–1929), Slovak inventor, architect, botanist, painter, patriot, and one of the founders of radiotelegraphy. He studied in Presssburg.
- Oskar Nedbal (1874–1930), composer and conductor, director of the Slovak National Theatre (1923–1930); conductor of the Bratislava Symphony Orchestra.
- Adam Friedrich Oeser (1717–1799), painter and sculptor. He studied in Pressburg.
- Ottakar II (see above 1271)
- Paracelsus (1493–1541), chemist, scientist and doctor. He visited Pressburg in 1537.
- Péter Pázmány (1570–1637), archbishop of Esztergom. He founded the University of Nagyszombat, and built Jesuit colleges and schools in Pozsony.
- Sándor Petőfi (1823–1849), important Hungarian poet, who often visited Pozsony
- Ignatius Paul Pollaky (1828–1918), private investigator/detective who moved to England in 1850 and became known as "Paddington" Pollaky. Mentioned in Gilbert & Sullivan's "Patience" (Act 1).
- Alajos Rigele (1879–1940), sculptor, born in Presssburg and author of many sculptures there
- Johann Andreas Segner (1704–1777), inventor of the (Segner wheel), doctor and professor, who was born and studied in Pressburg
- Franz Schmidt (1874–1939), composer and teacher, born in Pressburg
- Ľudovít Štúr (1815–1856), one of the most famous figures in modern Slovak history, leader of the Slovak national movement in the 19th century, and creator of the present-day Slovak language standard (see above 1843), he spent 20 years at the Evangelic Lutheran Lyceum (first as a student, then as a professor). Deputy of the Hungarian diet in Pressburg. Editor of the Slovak National Newspaper (Slovenskje národnje novini).
- Maria Theresa of Austria (1717–1780), Archduchess of Austria and Queen of Hungary and Bohemia. She spent much of her time in the Pressburg Castle; had the Castle walls demolished and the Castle restored (see above).
- Milan Rastislav Štefánik (1880–1919), one of the most important figures in modern Slovak history, astronomer and Slovak general of the French army, one of the creators of Czechoslovakia, he studied and died in Pressburg (Bratislava). The official name of the Bratislava Airport is "Milan Rastislav Štefánik Airport".
- Július Satinský (1941–2002), famous Slovak and Czechoslovak actor. He spent his whole life in Bratislava.
- Viktor Tilgner (1844–1896), sculptor and professor in Vienna, born in Bratislava; many of his sculptures are in Pressburg (e.g., the Ganymedes Fountain and the Hummel Monument).
- Jozef Tiso (1887–1947), president of the first Slovak Republic
- Rudolf Zahradník (born 1928), important Czech chemist born in Bratislava
- Ludwig Schwarz (born 1940), an Austrian bishop born in Bratislava
- Herta Däubler-Gmelin (born 1943), German politician
- Paul Wittich (1877–1957), labour leader in Pressburg around the First World War

== See also ==
- Timeline of Bratislava history
- History of the Jews in Bratislava
