= Private investigator =

Person hired to undertake investigatory law services

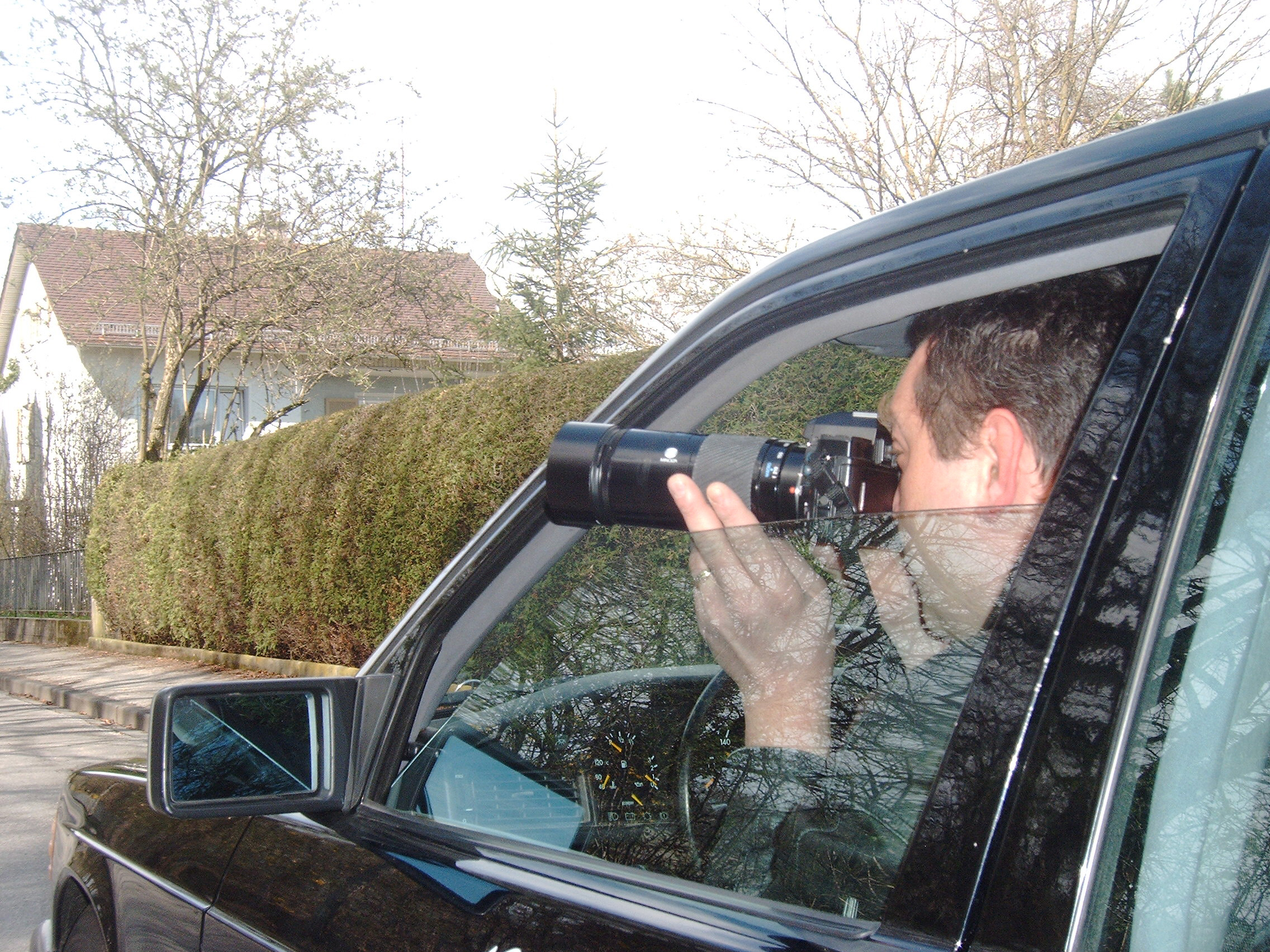
Private detectives can perform surveillance work on behalf of individuals

A private investigator (often abbreviated to PI; also known as a private detective, an inquiry agent or informally a private eye) is a person who can be hired by individuals or groups to undertake investigatory law services. Private investigators often work for attorneys in civil and criminal cases.

== History ==
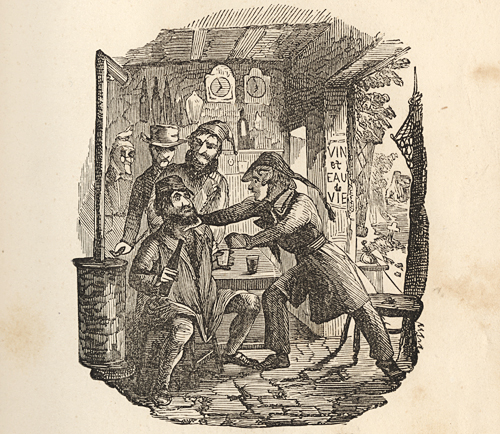
1859 illustration of Vidocq arresting a robber after tracking him down

In 1833, Eugène François Vidocq, a French soldier, criminal, and privateer, founded the first known private detective agency, "Le Bureau des Renseignements Universels pour le commerce et l'Industrie" ("The Office of Universal Information For Commerce and Industry") and hired ex-convicts. Much of what private investigators did in the early days was to act as the police in matters for which their clients felt the police were not equipped or willing to do. Official law enforcement tried many times to shut it down. In 1842, police arrested him in suspicion of unlawful imprisonment and taking money on false pretences after he had solved an embezzlement case. Vidocq later suspected that it had been a set-up. He was sentenced to five years and fined 3,000 francs, but the Court of Appeals released him. Vidocq is credited with having introduced record-keeping, criminology, and ballistics to criminal investigation. He made the first plaster casts of shoe impressions. He created indelible ink and unalterable bond paper with his printing company. His form of anthropometrics is still partially used by French police. He is also credited for philanthropic pursuits – he claimed he never informed on anyone who had stolen for real need.

In the United Kingdom, Charles Frederick Field set up an enquiry office upon his retirement from the Metropolitan Police in 1852. Field became a friend of Charles Dickens, and the latter wrote articles about him. In 1862, one of his employees, the Hungarian Ignatius Paul Pollaky, left him and set up a rival agency. Although little-remembered today, Pollaky's fame at the time was such that he was mentioned in various books of the 1870s and immortalized as "Paddington" Pollaky for his "keen penetration" in the 1881 comic opera, Patience.

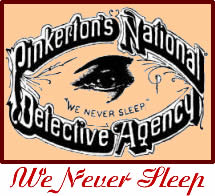
Logo of the Pinkerton National Detective Agency

In the United States, Allan Pinkerton established the Pinkerton National Detective Agency—a private detective agency—in 1850. Pinkerton became famous when he foiled a plot to assassinate then President-elect Abraham Lincoln in 1861. Pinkerton's agents performed services which ranged from undercover investigations and detection of crimes, to plant protection and armed security. At the height of its existence, the number of Pinkerton National Detective Agency active agents and reserves rivaled the number of active soldiers and reserves in the United States Army. Allan Pinkerton hired Kate Warne in 1856 as a private detective, making her the first female private detective in America.

A larger role for this new private investigative industry was to assist companies in labor disputes. Some early private investigators provided armed guards to act as a private militia. During the union unrest in the US in the late 19th century, industrialists would hire Pinkerton agents as undercover operatives to infiltrate and disrupt union activity or serve as armed guards for factories. In the aftermath of the Homestead Riot of 1892, several states passed so-called "anti-Pinkerton" laws restricting the importation of private security guards during union strikes. The federal Anti-Pinkerton Act of 1893 continues to prohibit an "individual employed by the Pinkerton Detective Agency, or similar organization" from being employed by "the Government of the United States or the government of the District of Columbia."

Pinkerton agents were also hired to track western outlaws Jesse James, the Reno brothers, and the Wild Bunch, including Butch Cassidy and the Sundance Kid.

== Employment ==
Many private detectives/investigators with special academic and practical experience often work with defense attorneys on capital punishment and other criminal defense cases. Others are insurance investigators who investigate suspicious claims. Before the advent of no-fault divorce, many private investigators sought evidence of adultery or other conduct within marriage to establish grounds for a divorce. Despite the lack of legal necessity for such evidence in many jurisdictions today, collecting evidence of spouses' and partners' adultery or other "bad behaviour" remain one of their most profitable undertakings, as the stakes nowadays are child custody, alimony, or marital property.

Private investigators can also perform due diligence for an investor considering investing with an investment group, fund manager, or other high-risk business or investment venture. This could help the prospective investor avoid being the victim of fraud. A licensed and experienced investigator could reveal the investment is risky and/or the investor has a suspicious background. This is called investigative due diligence, and is becoming more prevalent in the 21st century with the public reports of large-scale Ponzi schemes and other fraudulent investment vehicles.

There are also cases of corrupt private detectives who, at times, have been known to work for criminals such as stalkers and crime bosses to track down escaped victims, rival criminals and/or witnesses that have gone into hiding or to gather compromising evidence against witnesses, informants, prosecutors and/or police investigators that could be used in upcoming trials.

== Responsibilities ==
Private investigators also engage in a variety of work not often associated with the industry in the mind of the public. For example, many are involved in process serving, the personal delivery of summons, subpoenas, and other legal documents to parties in a legal case. The tracing of absconding debtors can also form a large part of a PI's work load. Many agencies specialize in a particular field of expertise. For example, some PI agencies deal only in tracing.

A handful of firms specialize in technical surveillance counter-measures, sometimes called electronic counter measures, which is the locating and dealing with unwanted forms of electronic surveillance (for example, a bugged boardroom for industrial espionage purposes). This niche service is typically conducted by those with backgrounds in intelligence/counterintelligence, executive protection, and a small number from law enforcement entities whose duties included the covert installation of eavesdropping devices as a tool in organized crime, terrorism and narco-trafficking investigations.

Other PIs, also known as corporate investigators, specialize in corporate matters, including antifraud work, loss prevention, internal investigations of employee misconduct (such as Equal Employment Opportunities violations and sexual harassment), the protection of intellectual property and trade secrets, antipiracy, copyright infringement investigations, due diligence investigations, malware and cyber criminal activity, and computer forensics work. Some PIs act as professional witnesses where they observe situations with a view to reporting the actions or lack of them to a court or to gather evidence in antisocial behavior.

== Undercover investigator ==
An undercover investigator, undercover detective, or undercover agent is a person who conducts investigations of suspected or confirmed criminal activity while impersonating a disinterested third party. Undercover investigators often infiltrate a suspected insurgent group, posing as a person interested in purchasing illegal goods or services with the ultimate aim of obtaining information about their assigned target.

Many undercover investigators carry hidden cameras and recorders strapped to their bodies to help them document their investigations. The period of the investigation could last for several months, or in some extreme cases, years. Due to the dangerous nature of the job, their real identities are typically kept secret throughout their active careers. Economic investigations, business intelligence and information on competitors, security advice, special security services information, criminal investigation, investigations background, and profile polygraph tests are all typical examples of such a role.

Certain types of undercover investigators, depending on their employer, will investigate allegations of abuse of workman's compensation. Those claiming to be injured are often investigated and recorded with a hidden camera/recorder. This is then presented in court or to the client who paid for the investigation.

== Around the world ==
Many jurisdictions require PIs to be licensed. Depending on local laws, they may or may not carry a firearm. Equipment can vary greatly, but generally involves a wide variety of surveillance equipment and recording devices. While PIs may investigate criminal matters, they typically do not hold any law enforcement authority by virtue of the position, regardless of licensure. Private investigators' authority is usually identical to other citizens' (off-duty or retired law enforcement officers serving as a PI may retain their police powers at all times, depending on the jurisdiction). They are expected to keep detailed notes and to be prepared to testify in court regarding any of their observations on behalf of their clients; irregular hours may also be required when performing surveillance work. Great care is required to remain within the scope of the law; otherwise, the private investigator may face criminal charges. However, there are also cases around the world, of corrupt or rogue private investigators who have obtained people's private data and information through illegal means. These include phone hacking, pretexting, identity theft and other illegal means of accessing government, insurance and police databases to obtain highly sensitive private information on their targets.

=== Australia ===
Private investigators in Australia must be licensed by the licensing authority relevant to the state where they are located. This applies to all states except the Australian Capital Territory. Companies offering investigation services must also hold a business licence and all their operatives must hold individual licences. Generally, the licences are administered and regulated by the state police; however, in some states, this can also be managed by other government agencies. The evidence collected by private investigators must adhere to strict rules of admissibility. If proper protocols are not followed during the investigation services, the evidence may be deemed inadmissible in the court of law.

To become registered in New South Wales requires a Class 2E licence, which can be applied for through the NSW Fair Trading website. The Australian Capital Territory does not require PIs to be licensed, although they are still bound by legislation. PIs working in the ACT cannot enter the NSW area without a CAPI license, else they will be in breach of the law. In Queensland, a private investigator need to be licensed under the Queensland Government and apply for a private investigator licence by completing an application for a security provider licence. Applicant will need to have a criminal history check and submit fingerprint.

=== Canada ===
Private investigators in Canada are licensed at the provincial level by the appropriate body. For instance, in the province of Ontario, private investigators are licensed and regulated by the Ministry of Community Safety & Correctional Services (MCSCS). In the province of Alberta, private investigators are licensed and regulated by the Alberta Justice and Solicitor General. Similar licensing requirements apply in other provinces and territories of Canada. As per the Ontario text of the Private Security and Investigative Services Act of 2005, private investigators are forbidden from referring to themselves as detective or private detective. In order to become a licensed private investigator, you must be 18 years of age or older in Ontario (in other Provinces and territories of Canada the eligible age to work may be higher); have a clean criminal record or obtain a waiver; and submit a correctly completed application for a license. You are required to complete 50-hours of basic training with an accredited source such as a university, college, or through private agencies licensed to administer the course. Upon completion of basic training, individuals are required to write and pass the basic test to obtain a private investigator's license

=== UK ===
In 2001, the Private Security Industry Act empowered the Security Industry Authority (SIA) to introduce licensing for private investigators in the United Kingdom. Although the SIA regulates various other sectors of the private security industry, the specific licensing framework for private investigators has never been fully implemented, and remains unimplemented as of February 2026. As a result, there is no government-backed licensing scheme for private investigators in the UK.

The SIA has periodically announced potential dates for when private investigator licensing might take effect, including a proposal for discussion in Parliament in May 2015. However, no formal scheme has emerged. In December 2014, Corporate Livewire published an article by a UK private investigator at BAR Investigations, discussing the implications of the unimplemented licensing regime and other industry concerns. The cost of hiring a private investigator in the UK varies according to the complexity of the inquiry and the investigator's level of experience, with typical daily rates ranging from £200 to £500.

=== United States ===
Private investigators in the United States may or may not be licensed or registered by a government licensing authority or state police of the state where they are located. Licensing varies from state to state and can range from: a) no state license required; b) city or state business license required (such as in the five states of Idaho, Alaska, Mississippi, South Dakota, and Wyoming); c) to needing several years of experience and licensing-related training classes and testing (as is the case with Virginia, West Virginia, and California). In some states (Indiana, Michigan, Rhode Island), work experience can be substituted with a bachelor's degree in criminal justice. In many states, companies offering investigation services must hold an agency license, and all of their investigators or detectives must hold individual licenses or registrations; furthermore, certain states such as Washington have separate classes of licensing for roles such as trainers of private investigators, individual private investigators, and private investigative agencies. A few states require character references from people not related to the applicant by blood or marriage (3 in Massachusetts, 5 in Minnesota). A few reciprocity agreements allow a US private investigator working in one state to continue work in another for a limited time without getting a separate license, but not all states participate in these agreements.

In 1887, Colorado became the first state in the union to institute licensing requirements for private investigators. Section 12-21-101 of the 1973 edition of Colorado Revised Statutes mandated license for "detective business", section 12-21-109 declared unlicensed operation a misdemeanor. However, on February 7, 1977, after El Paso County challenged a local security company Ro'Mar Investigation and Security, Inc.'s right to conduct investigations without a license, the Colorado Supreme Court deemed the law unconstitutional in People v. Ro'Mar, citing that the statute did not define a "detective business" and the Secretary of State lacked the ability to define it by rule. Following this, several private investigators formed Professional Private Investigators Association of Colorado (PPIAC) in order to try to get the licensing laws reinstated, but the bills died in the General Assembly. Four reviews carried out by the Colorado Department of Regulatory Agencies in 1985, 1987, 2000 and 2006 recommended against state regulation due to the lack to harm to consumers. On June 10, 2011, Governor John Hickenlooper signed into law Colorado House Bill 1195, which reinstated licenses for private investigators on voluntary basis effective July 1, 2012. A license applicant would have to be of 21 years of age or older, hold United States citizenship and have at least 4,000 hours of work experience as an investigator or part of a local, state or federal law enforcement agency; or 2,000 hours with post-secondary education.

On June 6, 2014, Hickenlooper signed into law Senate Bill 133, which effective June 1, 2015, made licensure mandatory. This split the licenses into two categories: Class I, requiring the applicant to be 21 years of age or older, hold United States citizenship and pass the Colorado Jurisprudence Exam. Class II requires in addition to Class I requirements a minimum of 4,000 hours of work experience as an investigator or part of a local, state or federal law enforcement agency. In 2019, following a review, the Colorado Department of Regulatory Agencies' Office of Policy, Research and Regulatory Reform suggested licensure requirement elimination, predicting "little to no consumer harm". In June 2020, Governor Jared Polis vetoed House Bill 1207 to keep licensure requirements, causing the licensure requirements to expire on August 31, 2021.

Florida has 3 types of licenses: Class CC for private investigator intern, C for private investigator, and MA for manager of a private investigative agency. As Class C license requires at least two years of experience, most applicants start with Class CC, which allows them to work under a sponsorship of a licensed Class C investigator.

For a Private Investigator License in New York, an investigator needs three years of verifiable experience, and to pass a NY State Department of State Division of licensing Services exam.

In 1893 a federal law was passed explicitly barring the government from employing the Pinkerton Detective Agency or a similar agency.

=== Vietnam ===
Current Vietnamese law stipulates that investigation is the authority of state agencies. According to the Investment Law and Decrees 108/2006/NĐ-CP and 52/2008/NĐ-CP, businesses providing security services are not allowed to conduct investigations or private detective activities in any form. However, due to social demand, private detective offices have rapidly developed.

Recently, private detective services have grown significantly, primarily in the form of information provision. Common services in Vietnam include information investigation, address finding, surveillance, phone number tracking, information verification, missing person searches, DNA testing, and counterfeit goods investigation. The cost of hiring a private investigator is around one million VND per day. For cases involving infidelity surveillance or searching for missing children, clients may pay tens of millions of VND per contract. Additionally, some internet service providers have shown signs of participating in this service. In general, Vietnam needs a clear legal framework for the private detective profession. In reality, many private detectives operate illegally, leading to calls for proper regulation of this profession.

== Fiction ==
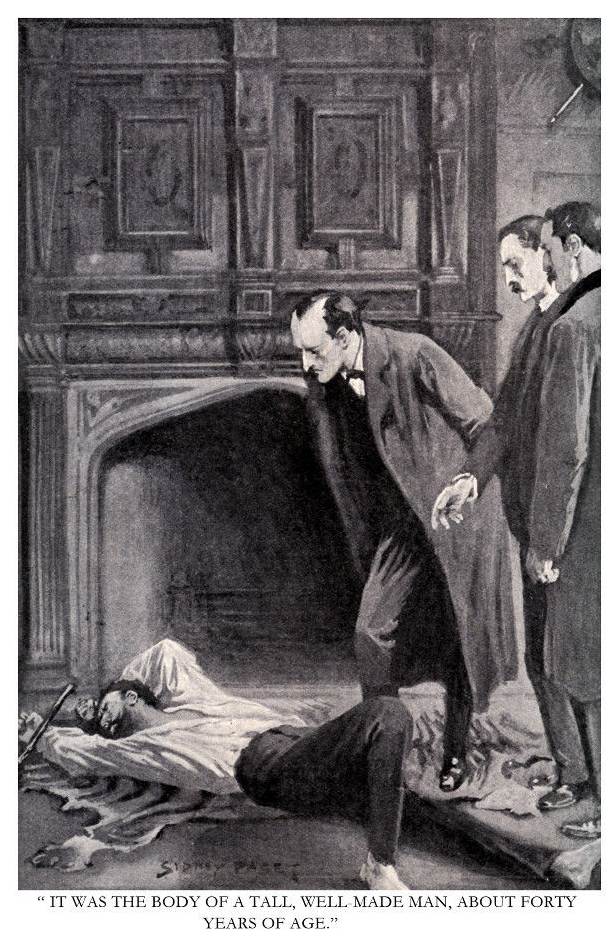
Sherlock Holmes, the world's most famous fictional private investigator

The PI genre in fiction dates to Edgar Allan Poe, who created the character C. Auguste Dupin in the 1840s. Dupin, an amateur crime-solver residing in Paris, appeared in three Poe stories. In addition, Sherlock Holmes, created by Arthur Conan Doyle in the late 1880s, is arguably the most prominent private investigator in fiction.

== Notable private investigators ==
=== In reality ===
- Jay J. Armes
- Edwin Atherton
- P. Balasubramaniam
- Guy Banister
- Rick Crouch
- David Fechheimer
- Charles Frederick Field
- Dashiell Hammett (also a notable author of detective fiction)
- Paul Henderson
- Justin Hopson
- James McParland
- Gordon Novel
- Jack Palladino
- Rajani Pandit
- Anthony Pellicano
- Allan Pinkerton
- Josiah "Tink" Thompson
- Eugène François Vidocq
- Kate Warne
- David P. Weber
- William Dear

=== In fiction ===
==== Americas ====
- Banacek
- Encyclopedia Brown
- Frank Cannon
- Richard Castle
- Nick and Nora Charles
- Richard Diamond
- Johnny Dollar
- Frankie Drake
- Paul Drake
- Nancy Drew
- Eric Duckman
- Mike Ehrmantraut
- Dick Grayson
- Peter Gunn
- Mike Hammer
- The Hardy Boys
- Barnaby Jones
- Jessica Jones
- Rip Kirby
- Thomas Magnum
- Joe Mannix
- Philip Marlowe
- Veronica Mars
- Adrian Monk
- Nate the Great
- Ezekiel "Easy" Rawlins
- Jack Reacher
- Jim Rockford
- Sam & Max
- John Shaft
- Simon & Simon
- Sam Spade
- Shawn Spencer
- David Spenser
- Three Investigators
- Ms. Tree
- Nick Valentine
- Eddie Valiant
- V. I. Warshawski
- Honey West
- Nero Wolfe

==== Asia ====
- Arjun
- Byomkesh Bakshi
- Goenda Baradacharan
- Parashor Barma
- Detective Conan
- Ekenbabu
- Feluda
- Hajime Kindaichi
- L
- Jayanta-Manik
- Mitin Masi
- Bhaduri Moshai
- Kiriti Roy
- Niladri Sarkar
- Takayuki Yagami

==== Europe ====
- Basil of Baker Street
- Nestor Burma
- Albert Campion
- Auguste Dupin
- Marcus Didius Falco
- Erast Fandorin
- Gil Jourdan
- Sherlock Holmes
- Frank Marker
- Hercule Poirot
- Mma Precious Ramotswe
- The Secret Seven
- Cormoran Strike
- Hetty Wainthropp
- Varg Veum

== See also ==
- Bounty hunter
- Detective
  - Hotel detective
  - Store detective
- Insurance investigator
- Investigative journalism
- Mercenary
  - Private Military Companies
- Mystery film
- Private police
  - Company police
- Espionage
- Counterespionage
- World Association of Detectives
