= Anti-Pinkerton Act of 1893 =

US federal law

Anti-Pinkerton Act
- Other short titles: Sundry Civil Appropriations Act of 1893
- Long title: An Act making appropriations for sundry civil expenses of the Government for the fiscal year ending June thirtieth, eighteen hundred and ninety-four, and for other purposes.
- Acronyms (colloquial): APA
- Enacted by: the 52nd United States Congress
- Effective: March 3, 1893

Citations
- Public law: 52-208
- Statutes at Large: 27 Stat. 572 aka 27 Stat. 591

Codification
- Titles amended: 5 U.S.C.: Government Organization and Employees
- U.S.C. sections created: 5 U.S.C. ch. 31, subch. I § 3108

Legislative history
- Signed into law by President Benjamin Harrison on March 3, 1893

The Anti-Pinkerton Act was a law passed by the U.S. Congress in 1893 to limit the federal government's ability to hire private investigators or mercenaries.

The Anti-Pinkerton Act is contained within 5 U.S.C. 3108 and purports to specifically restrict the government of the United States (as well as that of the District of Columbia) from hiring employees of Pinkerton or similar organizations such as the modern Blackwater.

The first published court case interpreting the Act, in 1977, held that the intent of the Act was in reference to Pinkerton's activities at the time, offering quasi-military armed forces for hire in the context of strikebreaking (not least the Homestead strike in 1892), "and therefore had little application" to the current organization.

== Statement of the Act ==
That hereafter no employee of the Pinkerton Detective Agency, or similar agency, shall be employed in any Government service or by any officer of the District of Columbia.
