= Church of the Virgin Mary, Vrakuňa =

Coordinates: 48°08′50″N 17°12′27″E

Church of Virgin Mary
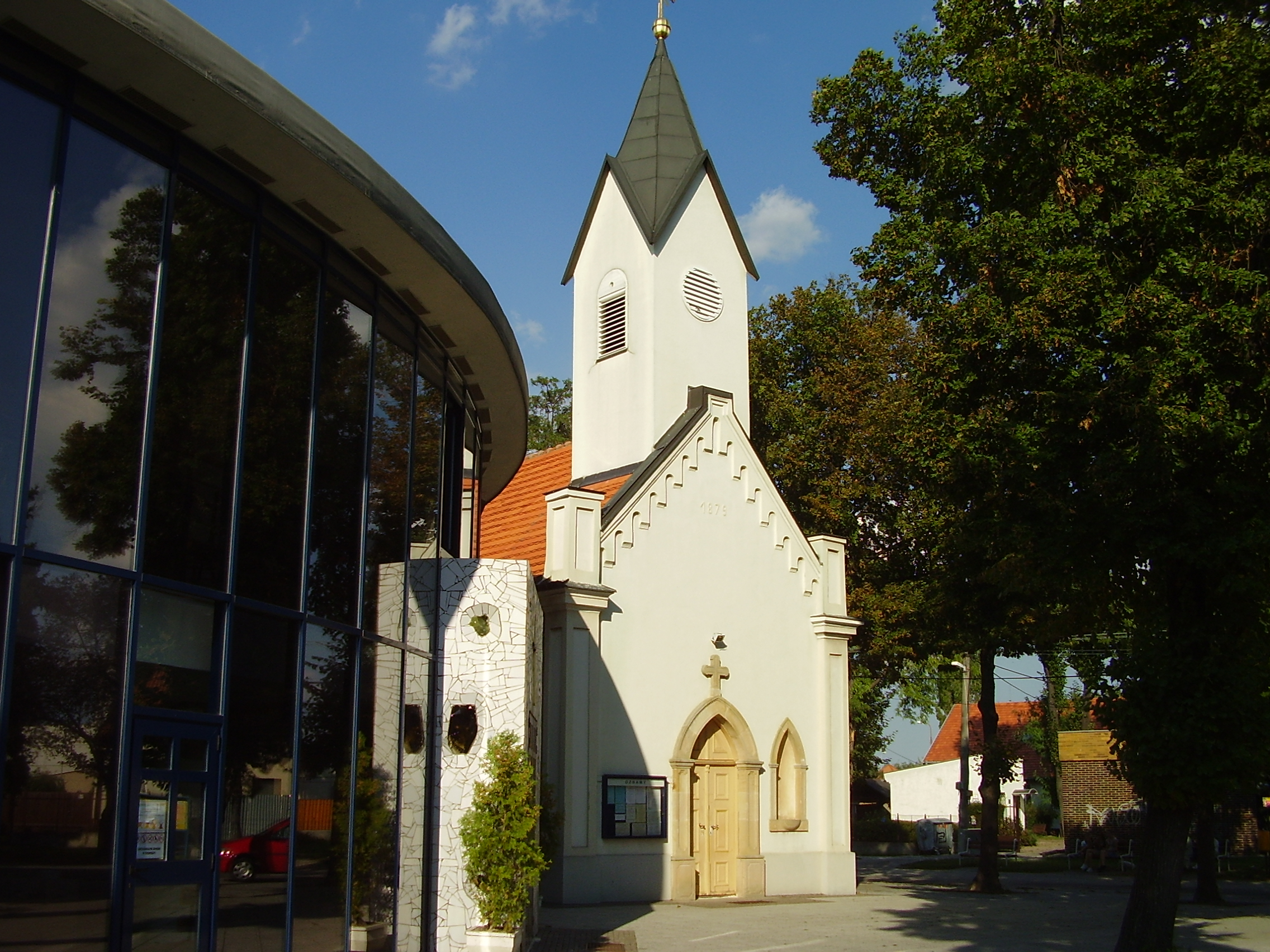
- Church of Virgin Mary
- Location: Bratislava-Vrakuňa
- Country: Slovakia
- Churchmanship: ThDr. Krošlák Marek, PhD; ThDr. Vivoda Michal, PhD; Mons. Mgr. Jozef Adamkovič
- Website: http://www.vrakuna.eu

Architecture
- Architectural type: Baroque
- Years built: 1879

Specifications
- Capacity: 500

Church of the Virgin Mary (Slovak: Kostol Mena Panny Márie; Hungarian: Szűz Mária Templom) is a church that was built in 1879 and is located on Poľnohospodárska street, in the Vrakuňa district of Bratislava. Its capacity did not meet the demand, so the church was extended with an addition. The foundation stone and the building site of the new part were feasted on 28 February 1993. The new church was put in use on 1 January 1994, and the ceremonial dedication was made by Archbishop Ján Sokol on 9 September 1995.
