= David Fechheimer =

American private investigator (1942–2019)

- Born: David Burgess Bissinger; 30 April 1942; Cincinnati, Ohio
- Died: 2 April 2019 (aged 76); Redwood City, California
- Education: San Francisco State University
- Occupation: Private investigator

David Fechheimer (30 April 1942 – 2 April 2019), nicknamed "Fech," was an American private investigator based in San Francisco. He worked on many cases involving celebrities or other notables, including Patty Hearst, Martha Stewart, Kobe Bryant, Timothy McVeigh and Angela Davis.

Inspired by Dashiell Hammett's novel The Maltese Falcon, while in graduate school Fechheimer enquired with Pinkerton about a job, asking if they would employ someone with a beard, and was immediately hired for an undercover job. This led to him leaving his master's program and becoming a private investigator. Later he worked for Hal Lipset, then in 1976 he formed his own agency, where he employed Josiah Thompson.

Among the many famous cases Fechheimer worked on was the paternity controversy after Larry Hillblom's death, where he obtained a DNA sample from Hillblom's mother by tricking her into licking a donation envelope at her church. He often worked for the defense in criminal cases, including in 2002 John Walker Lindh, when he travelled to Afghanistan to interview people to gather background information to discredit the prosecution case. He worked for Theranos, investigating employees Erika Cheung and Tyler Schultz.

Fechheimer had a lifelong interest in Dashiell Hammett. He was also a winemaker, owning a small vineyard and selling a cabernet sauvignon named after Hammett's novel Red Harvest.
