= Charles Frederick Field =

British police officer (1805–1874)

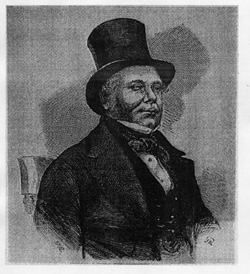
- Field in an 1855 engraving.
- Born: 1805; London, England
- Died: 1874
- Occupation(s): police officer private detective

Charles Frederick Field (1805 – 27 September 1874) was a British police officer with Scotland Yard and, following his retirement, a private detective. Field is perhaps best known as the basis for Inspector Bucket in Charles Dickens's novel Bleak House.

== Life ==
=== Joining the police ===
Born the son of the proprietor of a pub from Chelsea, Field had hoped to become an actor, but his impoverished circumstances led him to join the Metropolitan Police on its establishment in 1829, though no evidence supports Dickens' assertion that Field had previously been a Bow Street Runner. Initially joining E (Holborn) Division, where he rose to sergeant, he soon moved on to L (Lambeth) Division and later a section of R (Greenwich) Division devoted to the Woolwich Dockyards as an Inspector. Around 1846 he joined the Detective Branch (on the retirement of Shackell), and retired as its chief in 1852.

=== Relationship with Dickens ===
Charles Dickens had a particular fascination in the development of the police force in London and would occasionally accompany police constables on their nightly rounds. Through this, Field and Dickens became good friends. In 1850 Dickens wrote three articles for the journal Household Words in which he told stories of the adventures and exploits of the new police's Detective Branch, supplying character sketches of the detectives. In one of them, A Detective Party, he gave Field the pseudonym of "Inspector Wield" and described him as:

...a middle-aged man of a portly presence, with a large, moist, knowing eye, a husky voice, and a habit of emphasising his conversation by the air of a corpulent fore-finger, which is constantly in juxta-position with his eyes or nose.

In 1851, again for Household Words, Dickens wrote the short essay On Duty with Inspector Field about Field and his work. Field was almost certainly the model for Inspector Bucket in Bleak House, and the parallel was drawn by contemporaries–so much so that Dickens wrote in to The Times to comment on the rumours, without actually denying them. There is also some suggestion that R. D. Blackmore may have based Inspector John Cutting, who appears the novel Clara Vaughan, on Field.

In addition to these fictionalized portrayals, Field was frequently lionized by the press. Perhaps with a nod to his original calling, Field enjoyed using disguises, even when not necessary, a habit characterised by later police historian P T Smith as "self-indulgence". Dickens thought that Field "boasted and play[ed] to the gallery" and otherwise puffed his own image which, as noted above, sometimes got him into trouble.

=== Later life ===
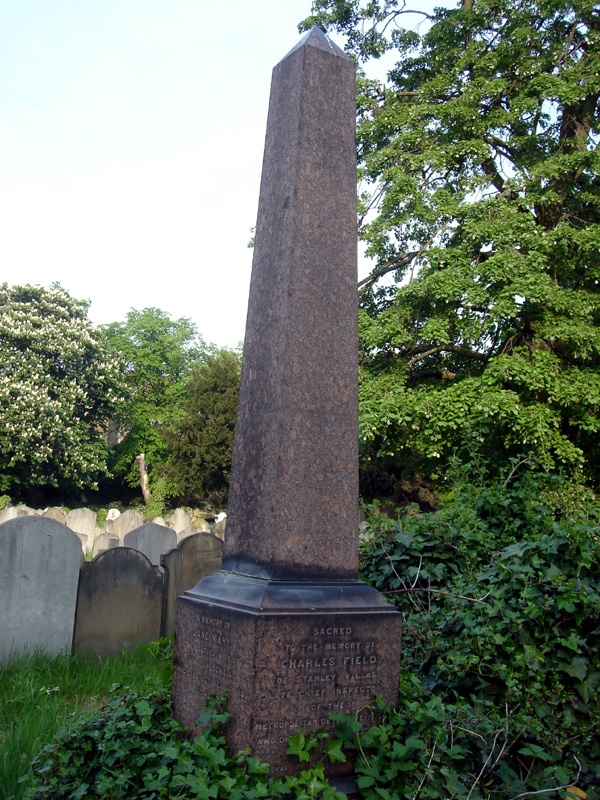
Funerary monument, Brompton Cemetery, London

After his retirement from the police, Field was in the press again, appearing in a 2 February 1856 supplement of the Illustrated News of the World, which was devoted to the trial of Dr Palmer of Rugeley, accused of poisoning three people. Although retired, the supplement described Field as "Inspector Field," implying that he was still active in the force. It also carried a memoir of his career. Field's actual involvement in the case was limited to a prior investigation of Palmer's financial activities, and he was not called to testify.

Field's repeated use of his rank after his retirement, in his capacity as a private detective, caused consternation in official quarters, leading to at least two investigations of his conduct and a four-month stoppage of his pension in 1861. In 1865 Sir George Grey, the Liberal Home Secretary, dismissed the matter, as Field had finally retired from that line of work as well. Field died in 1874 and is buried in Brompton Cemetery, London.

== Literary references ==
Field is the main protagonist of the novels The Darwin Affair by Tim Mason and Bucket's List and Bucket's Brigade by Gary Blackwood.
