= Josiah Thompson =

American writer, private investigator and scholar

Josiah "Tink" Thompson
- Born: January 17, 1935 (age 91); East Liverpool, Ohio, U.S.
- Occupations: Philosophy professor, private investigator

Academic background
- Education: Yale University

Josiah "Tink" Thompson (born 17 January 1935) is an American writer, retired professional private investigator, and former philosophy professor. In 1967, he published both The Lonely Labyrinth, a study of Kierkegaard's pseudonymous works, and Six Seconds in Dallas: A Micro-Study of the Kennedy Assassination. The culmination of his half-century-long Kennedy assassination project was published in early 2021 as Last Second in Dallas.

== Early life and professional careers ==
Born in 1935, Thompson was raised in East Liverpool, Ohio. He graduated from Yale University in 1957 and immediately entered the Navy, serving in Underwater Demolition Team 21. Returning to Yale, Thompson earned his Ph.D. in 1964. He joined the Yale faculty as Instructor in Philosophy and then moved on to teach at Haverford College. Thompson was part of the Haverford philosophy faculty, including a period living and researching in Denmark, until 1976. He wrote or edited several works about Danish philosopher Søren Kierkegaard.

In 1976 Thompson left academia and moved to San Francisco, to begin a new career as a private investigator, first working for Hal Lipset and then David Fechheimer. Thompson worked as a PI for thirty-five years, retiring in 2011. He worked mostly in criminal cases, including the investigation of dozens of murders. Among his better-known cases were participation in the defense of Bill and Emily Harris in the Patty Hearst kidnapping, and of Chol Soo Lee on murder charges. He was appointed by the federal court as investigator on the defense team for Timothy McVeigh in the Oklahoma City bombing trial, and investigated the bombing attack on environmental activists Judi Bari and Darryl Cherney.

In 1988, Thompson published Gumshoe: Reflections in a Private Eye, a well-received memoir discussing his post-academic life as a private detective.

Since 1976, Thompson has lived with his wife, Nancy, in Bolinas, California, a seaside village just north of San Francisco. He serves as registered agent for the Bolinas Cemetery Corporation, defending the 150-year-old graveyard from vandals, litterbugs and developers. Their daughter, Lis, died of breast cancer in 2015. Their son, Everson, practices as a criminal defense private investigator in San Rafael, California.

== Six Seconds in Dallas (1967) ==
In Six Seconds in Dallas, Thompson argued that the physical evidence and eye-witness accounts showed that multiple shooters fired within the same few seconds at President Kennedy in Dallas on November 22, 1963.

Fred Winship of the AP wrote that "some of Thompson's conclusions are based on original research in the National Archives, documents and photos not seen by the Warren Commission and interviews with eyewitnesses." The book was condensed in the Saturday Evening Post issue for December 2, 1967, generating news stories in both the New York Times and Newsweek. John Updike wrote a “Talk of the Town” piece for The New Yorker about “the Umbrella Man” (12/9/67) and described Six Seconds as “absolutely fascinating. It convinced me who’s never been a conspiracy man at all that the whole thing must be rethought.” Max Lerner devoted his syndicated New York Post column on November 27, 1967 to describing the book as “more careful and more powerful than the Warren Report. It was not until this book that I became clear in my mind about some kind of collaborative shooting.”

Time, Inc. sued Thompson and his publisher for infringement of copyright because of Zapruder frames sketched in the book. A federal court gave summary judgment to Thompson and his publisher ten months later in a landmark decision stressing fair use rights. On 2 April 1997 he testified at a public hearing of the Assassination Records Review Board in Washington, DC.

== Last Second in Dallas (2021) ==
Years later, Thompson completely revised his work on the Kennedy assassination, including some of his conclusions. Combined with personal memoirs and accounts of his investigation of the evidence, the 475-page illustrated result (361 pages of text, plus appendix, extensive notes and index), Last Second in Dallas, was published by the University Press of Kansas in February 2021.

In 1979, twelve years after publication of Six Seconds in Dallas, Thompson was hired to write part of a new book on the then-just-released House Select Committee on Assassinations (HSCA) Report. His assignment was to evaluate the part of the House Report dealing with the physical facts of what happened in Dealey Plaza. He gave up that project in frustration, the new book explains, when he became convinced that the core evidence in the case, as then understood, was internally contradictory. Confronting an apparent impasse, he turned away from the case and did not return to it until 2011.

During the 32 years since 1979, Thompson recounts in Last Second, the corpus of reliable evidence in the case changed. With respect to the forensic evidence in particular, Thompson claims that advances in scientific research with regard to both acoustics and ballistics removed what had been thought to be major facts from the table of genuine evidence, by showing them to be mistaken.

Thompson relies not only on the Zapruder film and the police radio dictabelt recording of the shooting (which he defends as valid), but also begins the book by quoting the reports of numerous witnesses he interviewed for LIFE magazine in 1966 and 1967. In the end, Thompson writes, he concluded that the cleansed forensic arguments confirm what numerous eye-witnesses reported just after the shooting in November 1963, that is, that Kennedy had been shot from the front as well as from behind.

Throughout the book, Thompson emphasizes and scrutinizes the raw facts of the case. Thompson argues from close examination of the Zapruder film that the last two shots can be seen hitting their target, and contends that these impacts match exactly the timing of shots heard on the dictabelt recording. When first struck in the head at Zapruder frame 313, almost five seconds after the initial burst of gunfire which had already wounded Kennedy and Texas Governor Connally, the President moves backwards and to the left. Riding to the limousine's left rear are two Dallas Police motorcycle outriders who experience brain and blood debris blown over them at high velocity. Thompson claims that less than a second later at frame 328, Kennedy is hit in the head a second time, from the rear, and his body and head are then catapulted directly forward, with blood and brain blasted as far forward as the car’s hood ornament.

In Last Second, as in Six Seconds some 54 years earlier, Thompson eschews all speculation as to who the conspirators may have been as well as their motives. Focusing on the final second of the assassination, he contends that Kennedy was hit twice in the head, just 0.71 seconds apart, by bullets fired from diametrically opposed directions. The first of these final and equally non-survivable shots, Thompson argues, came from behind a stockade fence atop the grassy knoll and not from the Texas School Book Depository, where Lee Harvey Oswald was located.

== The Umbrella Man ==
In 2011, The New York Times posted a short documentary film by Errol Morris featuring Thompson's commentary about the "Umbrella Man", a bystander holding a black umbrella during the assassination of Kennedy. In this interview, Thompson deploys both his philosophical and his criminal investigative skills to elucidate the difference between logical inferences premised on facts and speculative conspiratorial theorizing.

== Bibliography ==
- The Lonely Labyrinth; Kierkegaard's Pseudonymous Works (Southern Illinois University Press, 1967)
- Six Seconds in Dallas: A Micro-Study of the Kennedy Assassination (B. Geis Associates, 1967) ISBN 0394445716
- Kierkegaard: A Collection of Critical Essays (editor) (Anchor, 1972) ISBN 0385019785
- Kierkegaard (Knopf, 1973) ISBN 0394470923
- Gumshoe: Reflections in a Private Eye (Little, Brown, 1988) ISBN 0316841757
- Last Second in Dallas (University Press of Kansas, 2020) ISBN 9780700630080. Foreword by Richard Rhodes.
