= Eduard Nepomuk Kozič =

Hungarian photographer

- Born: Eduard Nepomuk Kozics; 21 May 1829; Dubnica nad Váhom, Kingdom of Hungary, Habsburg Empire (now Slovakia)
- Died: 25 April 1874 (aged 44); Bratislava, Kingdom of Hungary (now Slovakia)
- Occupation: Photographer

Eduard Nepomuk Kozič (21 May 1829 – 25 April 1874) was a photographer and inventor, known for his photo ateliers in the city center of Pressburg (today Bratislava). He created images of monuments of Bratislava and its surrounding, but was famous also as author of portraits (Franz Liszt, Graf Géza Zichy). He invented and patented a procedure to expose photographs on canvas, elephant bone, porcelain, wood, glass and email. In the 1850s he was the most prominent photographer in Bratislava. His portraits were the highlights of contemporary photography. He won many medals and awards from exhibitions (Paris 1867 and 1870, Hamburg 1868, Linz 1872). He died 25 April 1874, in Bratislava.

In 1847, he first encountered daguerreotype. He received training from traveling photographer Johann Bubenik. Soon he also learnt calotype (talbotype) technique and collodion process from Andreas Groll in Vienna between 1847 and 1850.

His first studio was set up in the garden pavilion of Slubek's house on Gaisgasse (today Kozia street 33) in the late 1840s (probably 1847).

His second studio was at Promenade no. 34 from 1856 – 1868 (now Hviezdoslavovo námestie).

On 1 October 1868 he opened in a newly built house on Promenade 2 his third studio. The place next to the Hotel zum grünen Baum (today hotel Carlton) was later renamed to Sétatér 9, then Kossuth Lajos Platz/Kossuth Lajostér 9, and today is Hviezdoslavovo námestie 4. The studio was known for its lively social happenings. Among Kozič's close friends was allegedly Franz Liszt. Kozic made several of his portraits, and in return Liszt gave several concerts in Kozic's studio salon. Kozic was one of Pressburg's most prominent and esteemed citizens. Kozič was considered to be 'one of the most capable lightscribes of the entire crown possession.' After his death, the studio continued to be operated by his wife Karolina Kozics-Helle until 1926. They had three children: Karolína Eleonóra Ema (born 3 October 1856), Pavlina Jozefina (born 27 June 1859) and Eduard František Xaver (born 2 January 1864). Artefacts from the studio are archived in museums in Bratislava and Košice. Kozics' photographs are part of the collections of Matica slovenská, Slovak National Museum in Martin Slovak National Gallery in Bratislava.

== Sources ==
- Ede Kozics on Monoskop.org
- Jakub Hlohoš, Eduard Nepomuk Kozič (in SLovak), 2012 Apr 25, 14:19
