= Justin Hopson =

American law enforcement officer, whistleblower, and author

- Born: Somers Point, New Jersey
- Education: New Jersey State Police Academy, 129th State Police Class
- Police career
- Department: New Jersey State Police
- Status: Retired
- Rank: State Trooper
- Other work: Investigative & Media Consultant. Award-Winning Author. NPC Bodybuilder

Justin Hopson is a retired New Jersey State Trooper, investigative & media consultant, author of Breaking the Blue Wall: One Man's War Against Police Corruption

== New Jersey State Police ==
As a trooper, Hopson investigated fatal accidents, homicides, suicides, sexual assault, armed robbery, narcotics, and spearheaded the missing person investigation of Karen Zendrosky (#C02085-393). The Zendrosky investigation spanned 24-years, Hopson coordinated a multi-agency effort to search for human remains, initiated wiretaps on the suspected murderer, gathered witness testimony, and later received commendations for moving the cold case forward. Trooper Hopson was then selected to the NJSP State Governmental Security Bureau where he was responsible for the security operations for the Dept. of Education, Dept. Environmental Protection, Dept. of Health and Human Services, Dept. of Agriculture, Dept. of Taxation, and the supervision of state proprietary security guards. In 2005, Hopson stopped and arrested suspected gang members in possession of a "Molotov Cocktail" (gasoline and motor oil used as an incendiary device) who allegedly planned to use the device against a rival. "The efforts of the troopers involved in this arrest thwarted a potentially deadly situation. We will not tolerate gang activity of any kind," stated NJ State Police Superintendent, Colonel Rick Fuentes.

== Whistleblower ==
As a New Jersey State Trooper, Hopson witnessed an unlawful arrest and false charges of a woman made by a fellow trooper. Consequently, Hopson refused to testify in court supporting the unlawful arrest and was then targeted by a rogue group of troopers known as the Lords of Discipline or "LOD." The LOD bullied and hazed fellow troopers for decades until Hopson blew the whistle. Hopson brought tangible evidence and a written chronology of events that occurred to internal affairs and the attorney general's office...which sparked the largest internal investigation in state police history and high profile federal case (Hopson v State of New Jersey #1:03-CV-5817). Trooper Hopson testified in a General Court Marshal against fellow troopers who were affiliated with the LOD - all of which pled or were found guilty and suspended. In October 2007, Trooper Hopson was awarded a $400,000 settlement from the State of New Jersey. ABC News, The New York Times, The Philadelphia Inquirer, The Star-Ledger, 20/20, and other media outlets have interviewed and featured Hopson concerning police corruption. During an interview, Hopson recounted spending an afternoon in the Catskill Mountains with a pivotal influence in his life, Frank Serpico. "As whistle-blowers, we shared similar stories of attempting to reform our respective police departments and understood one another's parallel hells. We played pool together, explored art galleries, and broke bread at an organic cafe spending hours in conversation. I found that Serpico's philosophies of life and law enforcement were all his own, transcending anyone's neat categories. Frank Serpico truly is a renaissance man and a friend," said Hopson.

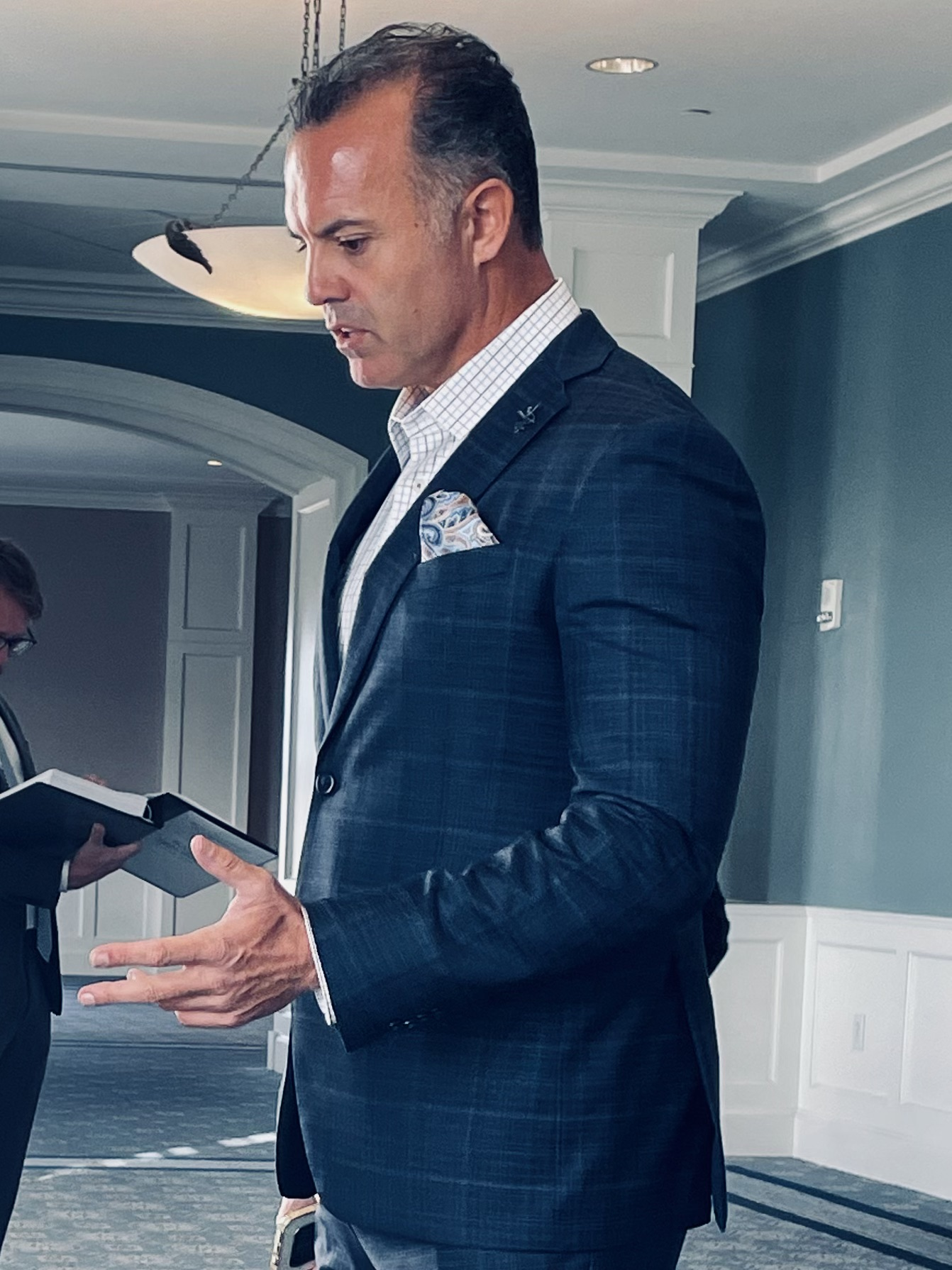
Charleston County Courthouse

== Investigative & media consultant ==
After retiring from the New Jersey State Police, Hopson founded a licensed private investigative firm in South Carolina. As a private eye, Hopson specializes in both civil and criminal investigations. Investigations such as skip-tracing, insurance fraud, marital infidelity, dram shop law, and corruption are his primary focus. Hopson led the high-profile investigation into the murder of James Belli (Case No. 2:10-cv-02356-RMG). Belli was killed by two inmates in Lieber maximum-security state prison. Hopson was able to unearth prison understaffing and extortion, which later led to a $450,000 settlement awarded to the estate of James Belli (Plaintiff). Hopson is a member of the National Association for Civilian Oversight of Law Enforcement and a member of the South Carolina Association for Legal Investigators (SCALI). SCALI selected and appointed Mr. Hopson to its Ethics Committee and invited him to be a keynote speaker at its annual conference. In 2013, Mr. Hopson was selected and appointed by Governor, Nikki Haley, to a South Carolina State Advisory Committee. That same year, Hopson was interviewed on ABC News 20/20 and his book, Breaking the Blue Wall climbed to #14 on Amazon's true crime ranking.

== Boxing ==
As a recruit in the New Jersey State Police Academy, Justin Hopson won the self-defense award for boxing. He trained and sparred at two boxing clubs in Southern New Jersey for seven years. Hopson was hired to provide security for Heavyweight Champion, Evander Holyfield at the IBF Annual Awards in Philadelphia, PA. In 2026, Justin Hopson was hired as Lead Trainer and Manager for BOUT Boxing and Fitness https://www.boutboxingusa.com/#boxing

== Personal life ==
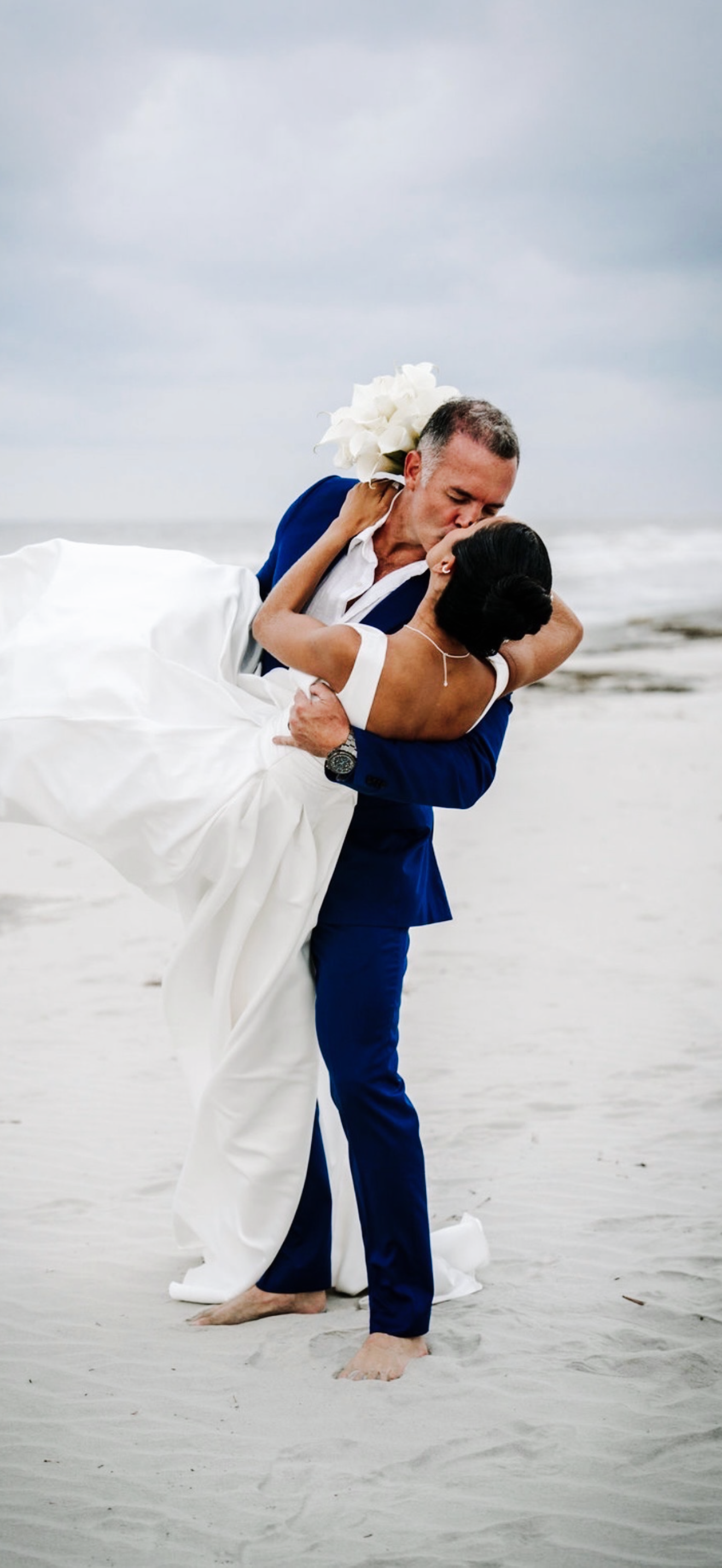
Kiawah Island, SC

Hopson went to High School in Delran New Jersey at Holy Cross. Hopson lives with his wife and two daughters in Charleston, South Carolina.
