= Vrakuňa =

- Borough
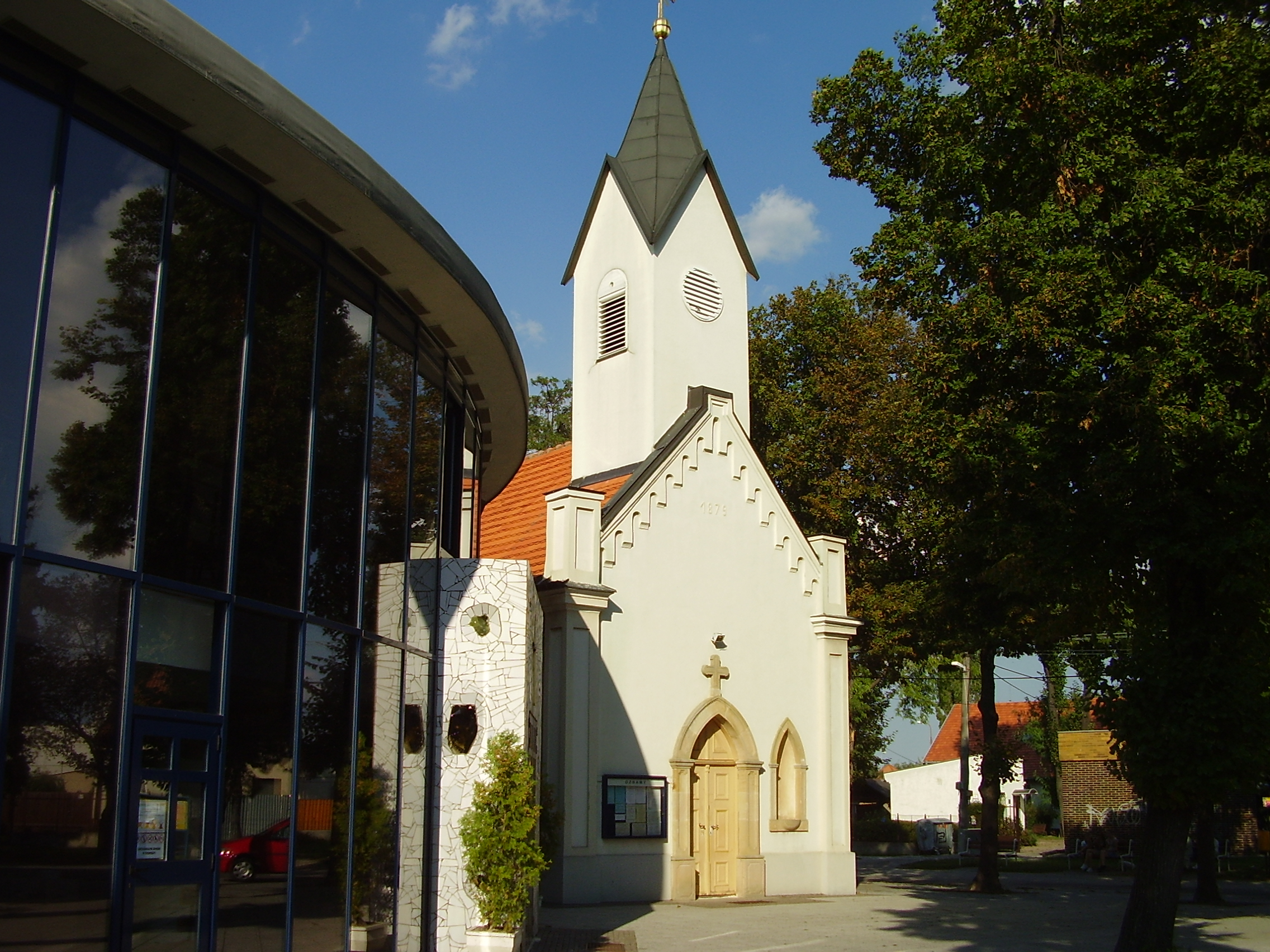
- Church of the Virgin Mary in Vrakuňa

- Flag Coat of arms

- Area of Vrakuňa in Bratislava

- Location of Vrakuňa in Slovakia Vrakuňa (Bratislava Region)
- Coordinates: 48°08′00″N 17°07′00″E
- Country: Slovakia
- Region: Bratislava Region
- District: Bratislava II
- First mentioned: 1290

Government
  - Mayor: Martin Kuruc

Area
  - Total: 10.29 km^{2} (3.97 sq mi)
- Elevation: 132 m (433 ft)

Population (2025)
  - Total: 20,178
- Time zone: UTC+1 (CET)
  - Summer (DST): UTC+2 (CEST)
- Postal code: 821 07
- Area code: +421-2
- Vehicle registration plate (until 2022): BA, BL, BT
- Website: www.vrakuna.sk

Vrakuňa (Hungarian: Vereknye, German: Fragendorf) is a borough of Bratislava, Slovakia. It is divided by into two parts by the Little Danube river.

== Transport ==
- Buses
  - Line 65
  - Line 67
  - Line 75
  - Line 78
  - Line 79
  - Line 87
- Trolleybuses
  - Line 201
  - Line 202
- Night buses
  - Line N70
- Night trolleybuses
  - Line N72

== Names and etymology ==
The first written mention of Vrakuňa was in 1279 as a village named Werekne. Some other recorded medieval names are Verekene (1290), Frecendorf (1297), Verekuna (1323), Oluerekenye (1356), Berekenye in theutonico Fratedorf (1393) or Vraknye (1459).

The name is probably derived from a Proto-Slavic appelative *vrakunъ, potentially reflecting Pre-Christian (pagan) rituals. The stem vra- means "to speak without making any sense", vrakúň – a wizzard, preserved in Russian: вракун, romanised: vrakun – a liar, a gossip). Lajos Kiss (1988) tried to drive the name from Proto-Slavic *vir- (a whirl). Šimon Ondruš (1990) from Proto-Slavic *vorkъ (in East Slavic languages: vorok - a fence, a barrier) like Vorkonъ, Vorkunovka and other similar names, but documented only for the East Slavs.

== History ==
Vrakuňa became an official borough of Bratislava on January 1, 1972.

== Geography ==
The municipality lies at an altitude of 132 metres (433 ft) and covers an area of 10.29 km^{2} (3.97 sq mi) (2025).

== Population ==
Population statistic (10 years)
Year	1995	2005	2015	2025
Count	18,479	18,996	20,114	20,178
Difference		+2.79%	+5.88%	+0.31%

Population statistic
Year	2024	2025
Count	20,157	20,178
Difference		+0.10%

It has a population of 20,178 people (31 December 2025).

=== Ethnicity ===
Census 2021 (1+ %)
Ethnicity	Number	Fraction
Slovak	17,576	84.86%
Not found out	2046	9.87%
Hungarian	869	4.19%
Czech	266	1.28%
Total	20,711	

In year 2021 was 20,711 people by ethnicity 17,576 as Slovak, 2046 as Not found out, 869 as Hungarian, 266 as Czech, 121 as Other, 75 as Rusyn, 70 as Ukrainian, 59 as Romani, 59 as German, 47 as Chinese, 40 as Polish, 39 as Russian, 38 as Serbian, 24 as Bulgarian, 23 as Vietnamese, 17 as Croatian, 16 as Italian, 16 as Moravian, 16 as Albanian, 13 as Austrian, 10 as Jewish, 10 as Romanian, 6 as Irish, 6 as Iranian, 6 as French, 4 as Greek, 4 as English, 2 as Silesian and 1 as Canadian.

Note on population: The difference values of population numbers in the table "Population statistic" and in the sections "Ethnicity" & "Religion" is caused by the use of various statistical methods.

=== Religion ===
Census 2021 (1+ %)
Religion	Number	Fraction
None	9059	43.74%
Roman Catholic Church	7871	38%
Not found out	2064	9.97%
Evangelical Church	684	3.3%
Total	20,711	

In year 2021 was 20,711 people by religion 9059 from None, 7871 from Roman Catholic Church, 2064 from Not found out, 684 from Evangelical Church, 204 from Greek Catholic Church, 127 from Eastern Orthodox Church, 121 from Ad hoc movements, 102 from Other, 95 from Christian Congregations in Slovakia, 70 from Calvinist Church, 53 from Other and not ascertained christian church, 47 from Jehovah's Witnesses, 42 from Buddhism, 41 from Islam, 32 from Baptists Church, 25 from Apostolic Church, 24 from Paganism and natural spirituality, 14 from United Methodist Church, 10 from Jewish community, 10 from Old Catholic Church, 8 from Hinduism, 3 from Church of the Brethren, 3 from Seventh-day Adventist Church and 2 from Church of Jesus Christ of Latter-day Saints.
