= Marián Hronský =

Slovak historian (1940–2012)

Dr. Marián Hronský DrSc.
- Born: August 4, 1940; Nová Baňa, Žarnovica District
- Died: June 3, 2012 (aged 71)
- Education: Charles University (Prague)
- Occupation: Historian
- Employers: Military History Institute (Bratislava); Institute of Political Science of the Slovak Academy of Sciences (SAS)
- Awards: Milan Hodža Award (2012, in memoriam)

Dr. Marián Hronský, DrSc. (4 August 1940 in Nová Baňa, Žarnovica District – 3 June 2012) was a Slovak historian. After graduating from Charles University in Prague, he worked at the Military History Institute in Bratislava and in the Institute of Political Science of SAS. In 2012, he received (in memoriam) the Milan Hodža Award for his scientific activities in the research of the personalities of Slovak politics.

== Books ==
- Slovensko na rázcestí: Slovenské národné rady a gardy v roku 1918 (Východoslovenské vydavateľstvo Košice 1976)
- Vzbura slovenských vojakov v Kragujevci (Osveta Martin 1982)
- Slovensko pri zrode Československa (Pravda Brat. 1987)
- Boj o Slovensko a Trianon 1918-1920 (Národné literárne centrum Brat. 1998)
- TRIANON - Vznik hraníc Slovenska a problémy jeho bezpečnosti 1918-1920 (2011)
