= Ignatius Paul Pollaky =

British private detective of Victorian era

Ignatius Paul Pollaky (po'laki; 1828 – 25 February 1918) also known as "Paddington" Pollaky, born in Hungary, became one of the first and best-known professional private detectives in Britain. He also worked with London's Metropolitan Police, specialising in intelligence on aliens living in Britain and advocating alien registration, which was eventually introduced by the Aliens Act 1905

== Biography ==
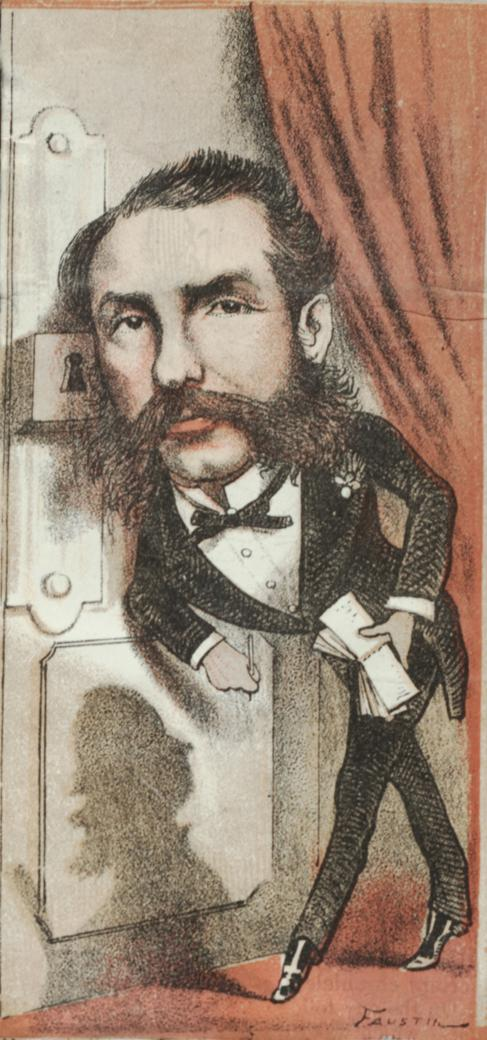
Ignatius Pollaky by Faustin Betbeder (1874)

Pollaky was born in Pressburg, Hungary (Pozsony, now Bratislava, Slovakia). He was exiled and came to live in Britain in 1850. In 1856 he married Julia Devonald. However she died in 1859. Two years later he married Mary Anne Hughes. They had a son and three daughters over the next nine years.

In 1862 he started an early private detective agency in Britain, Pollaky's Private Inquiry Office. One of his first commissions was from Henry Sanford who asked him to spy on Confederate agents in Britain who were purchasing supplies for the American Civil War. From 1865 until 1882 his office was located at 13 Paddington Green, hence his nickname. He often advertised in the personal section of The Times offering assistance in "election, divorce and libel cases" or "discreet enquiries in England or abroad". From 1861 onwards, he also was in the habit of inserting mysterious messages in the "Agony" columns, presumably linked to cases that he was working on. In 1867 he became a special constable in the X (Willesden) Division of the Metropolitan Police, a division only formed two years earlier.

During his career his reputation grew to the point that his surname was used as a humorous remonstrance against over-eager questioning by the 1870s and in 1881 he was mentioned in the Gilbert and Sullivan work, Patience, as an example of "keen penetration". "Benjamin D——, His Little Dinner", an anonymous 1876 satire on Benjamin Disraeli, also carried a poem about Pollaky entitled "The Lord of Intrigue":

Pollaky sat in his oaken chair.
Carte de visite and letter lay there,
Princely coronet, lordly crest.
Many a mystery, many a quest,
With missive and billet of lesser degree,
In sooth an extraordinary company;
And they seemed to ask, oh, unravel me;
Never, I ween,
Was a subtler seen,
Concerned in divorce, or elopement, or league.
Than love's autocrat, Pollaky, lord of intrigue.
In and out
Through the motley rout,
The Lord of Intrigue goes hunting about,
Here and there.
Like a dog in a fair,
Through flights and divorces,
Elopements and curses.
Through a lady's love and a husband's grudge,
Proud as a Cardinal, sharp as a Judge;
And he smiles in the face
Of the scrawl of his Grace,
With a satisfied look, as if he would say,
"Oh, the duchess must fall in our trap to-day."
While his clients with awe
As such schemes they saw.
Said, "Pollaky's sharper than Hades, you know."
Never, I ween,
Was a subtler seen,
Concerned in divorce, or elopement, or league.
Than love's autocrat, Pollaky, lord of intrigue.

Apart from his detective work, he acted as the London correspondent for the International Criminal Police Gazette for more than 25 years. He appeared on the Electoral Registers for the Paddington and St Marylebone districts in 1873, 1875 and 1876. In 1882 he retired from the private investigation business and closed his office. In the same year, he inserted an advertisement on the front page of The Times stating that: 'the rumour that I am dead is not true'. After retiring from the private investigation business he moved to 33 Stanford Avenue, Brighton where he lived quietly with his wife.

During his retirement he was well known for playing chess in the Public Room at the Brighton Pavilion and often wrote letters to The Times, signing them "Ritter von Pollaky". His initial 1862 application for British citizenship had been refused, but on 17 September 1914, he took the Oath of Allegiance and became a naturalised British Citizen. He died on 25 February 1918 and was buried in Kensal Green Cemetery.
