= History of the Jews in Bratislava =

History of a Jewish community in Slovakia

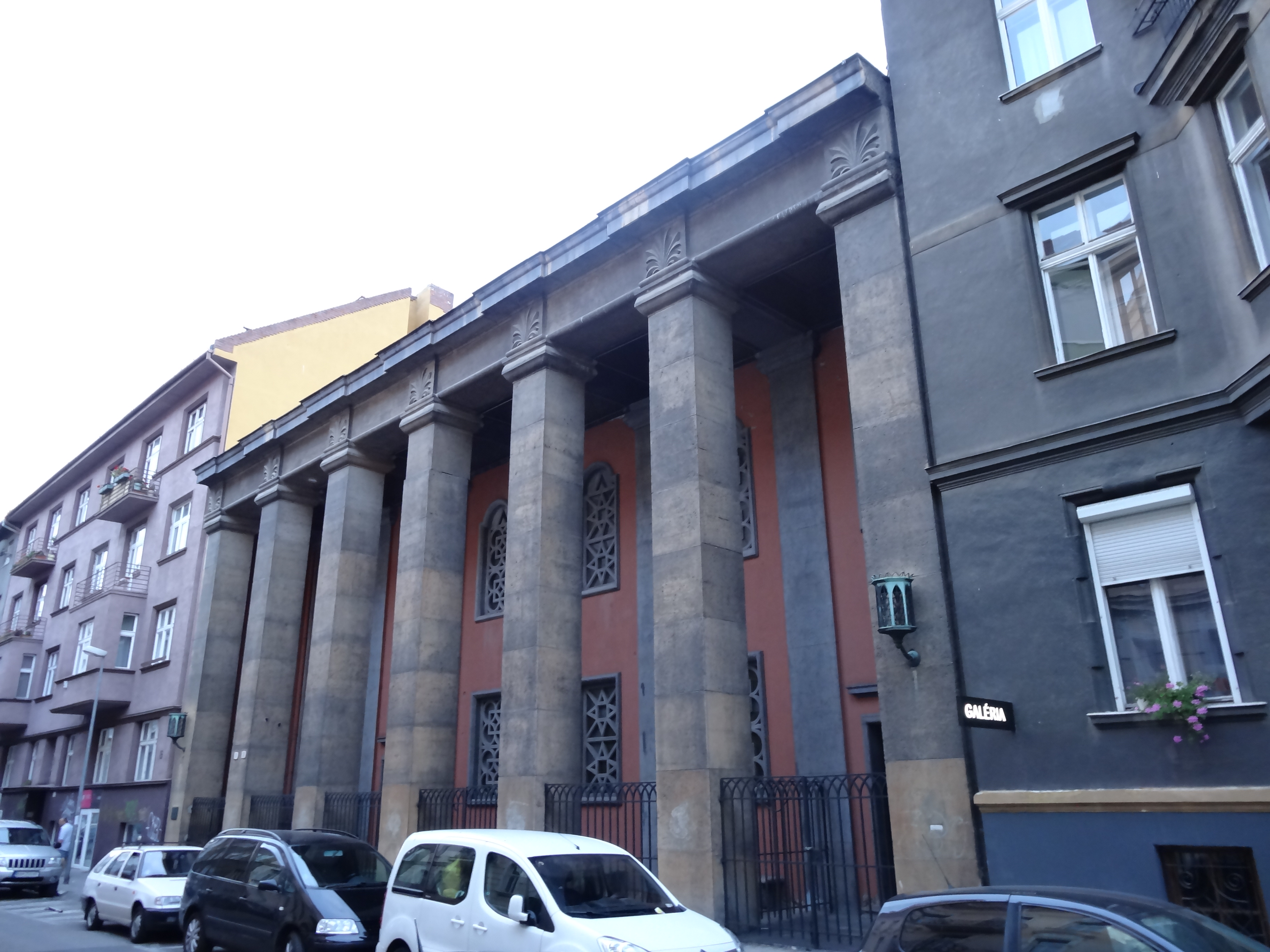
Heydukova Street Synagogue built in 1926 in cubist style is the only synagogue in Bratislava.

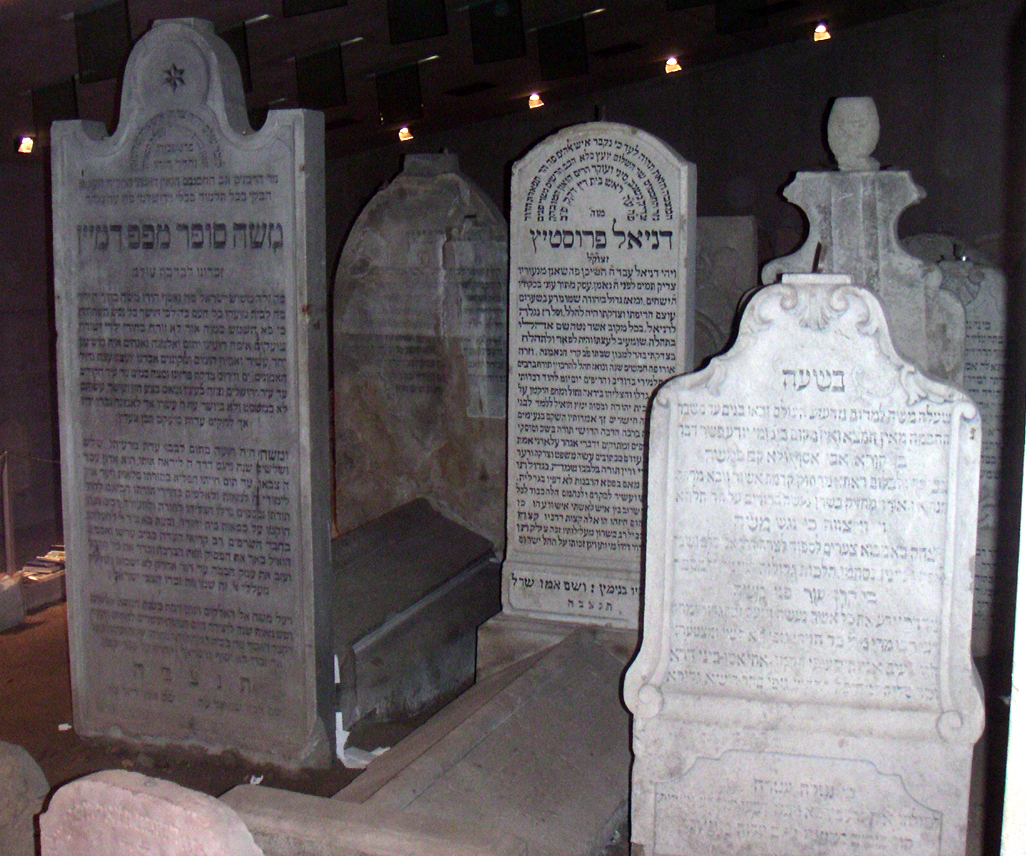
Chatam Sofer Memorial containing the graves of the Rabbis from the Old Jewish Cemetery is an important visiting site in Bratislava.

The first record of the Jewish community in Bratislava, capital of Slovakia, dates from 1251. Until the end of World War I, Bratislava (known as Pressburg or Pozsony through much of its history) was a multicultural city with a Hungarian and German majority and a Slovak and Jewish minority. In 1806 when the city was part of the Kingdom of Hungary, Rabbi Moses Sofer established the Pressburg Yeshiva and the city emerged as the center of Central European Jewry and a leading power in the opposition to the Reform movement in Judaism in Europe. Pressburg Yeshiva produced hundreds of future leaders of Austro-Hungarian Jewry who made major influence on the general traditional orthodox and future Charedi Judaism.

The Bratislava Jewish Community was the largest and most influential in Slovakia. In 1930, approximately 15,000 Jews lived in the city (total population was 120,000). Part of the community emigrated during the late 1930s and after the Second World War but despite organized efforts such as the Bratislava Working Group, the majority of Bratislava Jews were murdered in the Holocaust.

Today, Bratislava features the Heydukova Street Synagogue, Museum of Jewish Culture, Bratislava Jewish Community Museum, the Chatam Sofer Memorial, the Neolog cemetery and the Orthodox cemetery and many other Jewish landmarks and monuments. Bratislava Jewish Community comprises approximately 500 people and since 1993, the Chief Rabbi of Slovakia and Rabbi of Bratislava is Baruch Myers.

== Early history ==
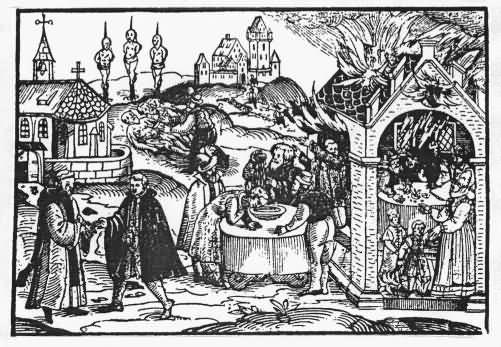
Jews mocking the Host in Pressburg (Bratislava); antisemitic woodcut from 1591.

It is known that Jews were active as traders and liaisons between the Roman legions and Germanic tribes north of the river Danube. The area of today's Bratislava was at the crossroads of important trade routes and Jews passed through this area from the 1st century CE, although there are no records of them settling here. Jews started to migrate in larger numbers to Upper Hungary in the 11th century as first Jewish settlements appeared also in Bratislava. Bratislava Jews of this time had strong connections to the Jewish Community of Esztergom. The first Jewish religious community in Bratislava was founded in the late 13th century, as evidenced by the Menor Codex (Memorbuch) from Mainz. Sometime between 1250 and 1300, the Rabbi of Bratislava was Jonah (or Yonah).

Bratislava Jews always formed a compact community somewhat closed to the outside world. They were employed in finance, as merchants, craftsmen, artisans and even winemakers and they lived in the areas of today's Nedbalova Street, Františkánska Street, Zámočnícka Street and Baštová Street. A 1299 decree of Andrew II of Hungary granted to Bratislava's Jewish inhabitants rights equal with other citizens of the city. Jews became represented by a Jewish Mayor, elected from the ranks of Christian citizens by the King and since 1440 by the Bratislava City Council.

The existence of a synagogue in the city is attested by a 1335 decree of Pope Benedict XII which mentions a letter from the local Cistercian Order to the Archbishop of Esztergom asking him to have the Jewish temple demolished. It is one of the first written mentions of Jews living in the city. The Cistercian Cloister stood near the today's cloister on Uršulínska Street with the synagogue directly next to it. The Pope had the Archbishop investigate the situation and soon afterwards, the synagogue was demolished. A gothic entrance portal from this synagogue was uncovered in the 1990s, it is located in the courtyard of a building on Panská Street No. 11. The synagogue was rebuilt in 1339. In the 14th century there were several hundred Jews living in Bratislava and the city featured a synagogue, a Jewish cemetery, a mikveh and other public Jewish institutions.

In 1360, all Jews were expelled from Bratislava and their belongings were confiscated, part of the community found refuge in the town of Hainburg an der Donau. In 1367 or 1368 several Jewish families were permitted to return. In 1399 permission was granted for construction of a synagogue, probably at the place of the formerly destroyed one. At the end of the 14th century, there were approximately 800 Jews living in the city (total population of the city in 1435 was 5,000).

During the first half of the 15th century Jews were forced to live in a Jewish ghetto on Jewish Street. At the end of the 15th century, Bratislava City Council implemented the 1215 decree of Pope Innocent III which ordered that Jews are required to wear distinct clothing, by ordering the Bratislava Jews to wear a red hooded cape at all times, in order to be visible from the distance. In 1506, Vladislaus II of Hungary tried to prevent Jews from leaving Bratislava by confiscating the property of anyone who left. In 1520, Louis II of Hungary decreed that Jews no longer had to wear distinct clothing but it wasn't until the Prefect of Bratislava Jewry Jakub Mendel complained directly to the King in 1521, that the city was forced to change the law. Despite discrimination, the community grew and was allowed to build a second synagogue.

Jews were expelled and accepted back several times in history of Bratislava, but after the Battle of Mohács in 1526 they were expelled permanently as part of the general expulsion from the Kingdom of Hungary. The synagogue was torn down and a monastery was built in its place. Many Bratislava Jews fled into neighboring Austria but a few remained in an area called Schlossgrund, outside of the walled city. Most of them left in 1572 on the orders of Maximilian II, Holy Roman Emperor. In 1599, Count Nicolaus Pálffy ab Erdöd inherited the Bratislava Castle and the Schlossgrund area and allowed Jews to settle here. In 1670, when the Jews of Vienna were expelled, many refugees settled in Schlossgrund and a Jewish quarter later becoming synonymous with the Vydrica area began to form. The size of the Jewish population of Bratislava in the Middle Ages varied from several hundred to 900 Jewish citizens.

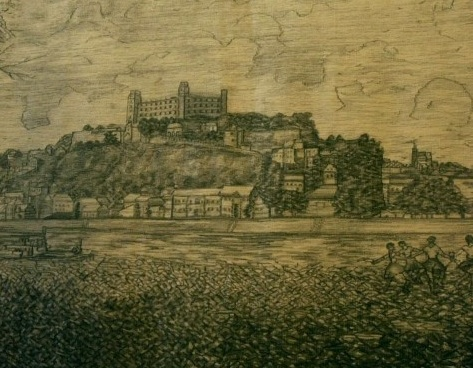
Schlossgrund (Podhradie) in the 17th century.

As early as 1689 a Chevra Kadisha operated in Bratislava along with other charitable institutions. A Jewish cemetery was established on the outskirts of the city which later became known as the Old Jewish Cemetery.

In 1707, there were 200 Jewish families living in Schlossgrund under the protection of the noble Pálffy ab Erdöd family, most of them refugees. In 1709 Jewish population was 189, in 1732, there were 50 Jewish families living in Schlossgrund, and in 1736 the population was 772.

Jews were permitted to return to the city in the 1700s, and the population increased to 2,000 Jews by the end of the 18th century. During the 18th century the city was home to a yeshiva, which under the direction of Meir Halberstadt attracted many rabbis into the city.

== Pressburg Yeshiva and rise in importance ==
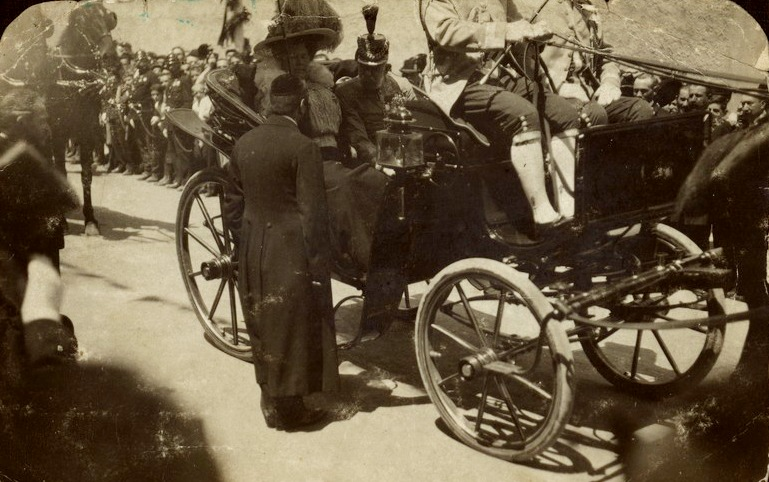
Rabbi Akiva Sofer greeting Franz Joseph I of Austria on his official visit to Bratislava in 1913.

In 1806, Moses Sofer accepted a rabbinate in Bratislava and settled in the city. In the same year, he established the Pressburg Yeshiva which was the largest and most influential Yeshiva in Central Europe in the 19th century. During Sofer's tenure as the Rabbi of Bratislava (1806 – 1839), the yeshiva was attended by hundreds of students. After Sofer's death in 1839, his son Samuel Benjamin Sofer known as the Ktav Sofer became the Rabbi of Bratislava. After his death in 1871, his son Simcha Bunim Sofer known as the Shevet Sofer became Rabbi. The last Rabbi of Bratislava from the Schreiber – Sofer dynasty was Akiva Sofer known as the Daas Sofer, who emigrated in 1939 to Mandatory Palestine and later re-founded the yeshiva in Jerusalem.

On 5 June 1839, the Diet of Hungary convened in Bratislava and in 1840 passed a law enabling Jews to freely settle in any free city. During and after the Hungarian Revolution of 1848, there were pogroms on Bratislava Jews. In 1864 a synagogue, later to be called the Bratislava Orthodox Synagogue, was built on Zámocká Street in Schlossgrund. A progressive Jewish elementary school was established in the city despite opposition from the Rabbi of Bratislava Samuel Benjamin Sofer.

After the Austro-Hungarian Compromise of 1867, the General Jewish Congress of Budapest, attended also by delegates from Bratislava, tried to unify Hungarian Jews. The efforts failed and in 1868 Hungarian Jewry split into three factions: Orthodox, Neolog (reform), and Status Quo. There were approximately 1,000 Orthodox Jewish families in the city and approximately 60 Neolog Jewish families.

In 1872, under Rabbi Samuel Benjamin Sofer the Bratislava Jewish community split, The smaller Neolog community established a separate Chevra Kadisha, synagogue, and other establishments. In 1897, the first Zionist group active in Bratislava, Ahavat Zion, was formed. In 1902, the Hungarian Zionist Organization was established in Bratislava, in 1904 the World Mizrachi Organization was established, both on the initiative of Samuel Bettelheim.

At the beginning of the 20th century, conditions began to steadily improve, and many Bratislava Jews acquired university education. They started to influence the life and commerce in Bratislava. In the 1900 local elections, 24 Jews were elected to the Bratislava city council. According to the 1910 census, there were 8,027 Jews living in the city. In 1913, the Jewish quarter in Schlossgrund was ravaged by fire but was quickly rebuilt.

During the First World War, several hundred Bratislava Jews served in the Austro-Hungarian Army, and around 50 were killed. After the war, Austria-Hungary collapsed and the events were accompanied by attacks on Jews, which continued during the Hungarian Revolution of 1919 and ceased only after the newly created Czechoslovak regime established control in 1919. The community was partially protected by a guard formed by Jewish soldier veterans.

During the interwar period, many Bratislava Jews owned businesses and many were employed as doctors, lawyers, engineers, teachers, artists and more.

In the early 1920s there were approximately 11,000 Jews in Bratislava, 3,000 Neolog and 8,000 Orthodox. In the 1930 there were 14,882 Jews in the city (12% of the total population), 5,597 of declared Jewish nationality. In the 1938 elections, Kraus of the Jewish National Party was elected Deputy Mayor of Bratislava, and three Jews were elected to the Bratislava city council.

The four most prominent organizations influencing the life of Bratislava Jews as well as Slovak Jews in general during the interwar period were the Jewish Party, the Orthodox community, Yeshurun - the liberal community, and the Histadrut.

== Destruction of the Bratislava Jewry ==
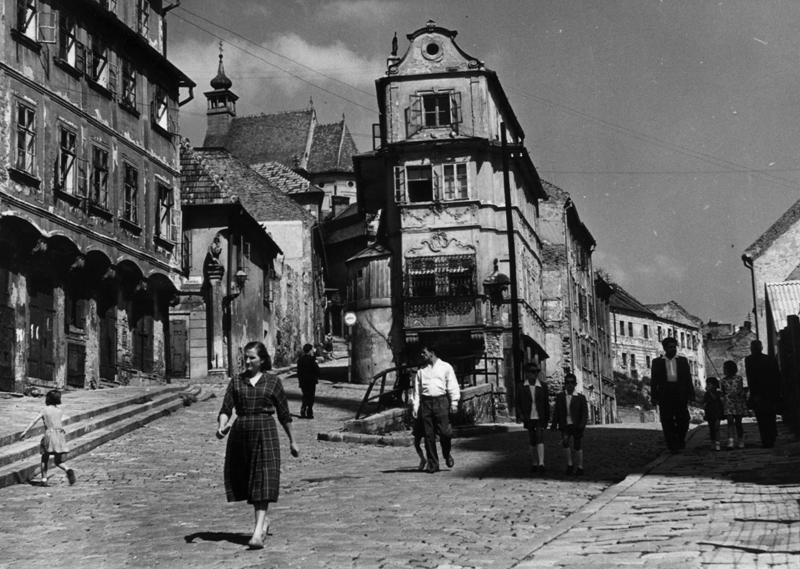
Mikulášska Street and Židovská Street, part of the former Jewish Quarter in Bratislava in the 1930s.

In the late 1930s, antisemitic riots threatened the Jewish population of Bratislava. It was during this time that Imi Lichtenfeld helped to defend his Jewish neighborhood against racist gangs by utilizing principles he would later use to found the martial art Krav Maga. On 11 November 1938, violent attacks on the Bratislava synagogues and the Pressburg Yeshiva occurred and sporadic pogroms continued during the war.

After the creation of the Slovak State in March 1939, discriminatory measures were undertaken by the government against the Jewish minority. On 25 March 1942, deportations of Jews out of Slovakia commenced. German forces occupied Bratislava in September 1944 and the approximately 2,000 remaining Jews were sent to Auschwitz via the concentration camp in Sereď. Despite organized effort by the Bratislava Jewish Community, most of its members were ultimately deported into extermination camps in occupied Poland.

In December 1944, Nazi Germany established the Engerau concentration camp in Petržalka (German: Engerau). Engerau was a labor camp. On March 30, 1945 some of the remaining prisoners were killed by guards and the remaining inmates were sent on a death march to Bad Deutsch-Altenburg. Today, no evidence of the camp remains due to the large-scale construction project in Petržalka later in the 20th century when the former village was transformed into the largest panel hause complex in Central Europe.

== After World War II ==
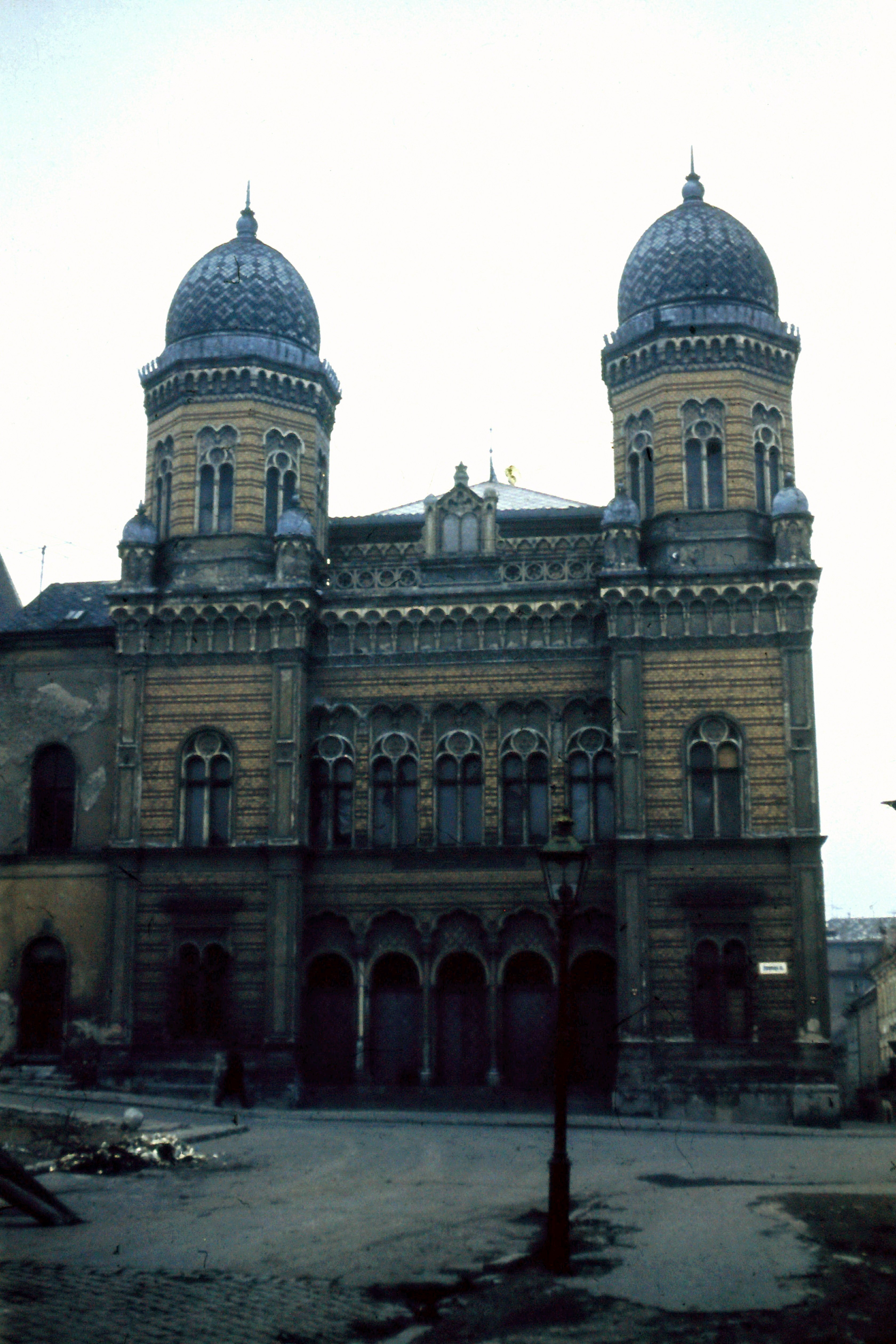
Bratislava Neolog Synagogue built in 1893, demolished in 1967–1969.

Of the over 15,000 Jews living in Bratislava in 1940, only approximately 3,500 survived World War II. Jews returning to Bratislava from the war met with indifference and sometimes even hostility. Many found new people living in their former homes. Immediately after the war, Bratislava became the centre of Slovak Jewry due to the fact that many Slovak Jewish survivors preferred to settle in Bratislava as opposed to their former hometowns in the country.

On April 15, 1945, Max Weiss became the chairman of the revived Jewish community and prayer services were renewed in the Heydukova Street Synagogue. Jewish newspapers started to be printed and the community re-established a mikveh, ritual slaughter, kosher butcher and canteen, homes for the aged, schools and a hospital.

Difficulties were encountered in recovering seized Jewish property taken by local Slovaks. These economic factors combined with deep-rooted and widespread antisemitism fueled by antisemitic propaganda caused the vast majority of Slovaks in Bratislava to feel hostile towards the Jews. Jews in the city were physically attacked during the Partisan Congress riots (1–6 August 1946) and later riots on 20–21 August 1948.

At the same time, Bratislava became a major transit point for Polish, Hungarian and Romanian Jews who survived the war and were headed for the transit camp in the Rothshild Hospital in Vienna in the American Occupation Zone in Austria run by the Jewish Agency. From 1945 until February 1949, more than 150,000 Jewish migrants passed through Bratislava, most of them leaving though the border at Devínska Nová Ves. Refugees were at first housed in a camp in Devínska Nová Ves and later in several Bratislava hotels (Hotel Central and Hotel Jeleň) and the ŽNO kitchen in Bratislava. These Jews were met with no sympathy from the citizens of Bratislava, who feared that the migrants might settle in the city.

In 1949, the communist regime came into power in Czechoslovakia.

The majority of war survivors decided to emigrate out of Slovakia. Of the 30,000 Jews who remaining in Slovakia at the end of World War II, 90% emigrated in the following months and years.

The Jewish quarter in Podhradie, a historical part of Bratislava, was demolished in the 1960s by the communist authorities of the city.

The Museum of Jewish Culture was established in 1994 as a branch of the Slovak National Museum.

== Gallery ==
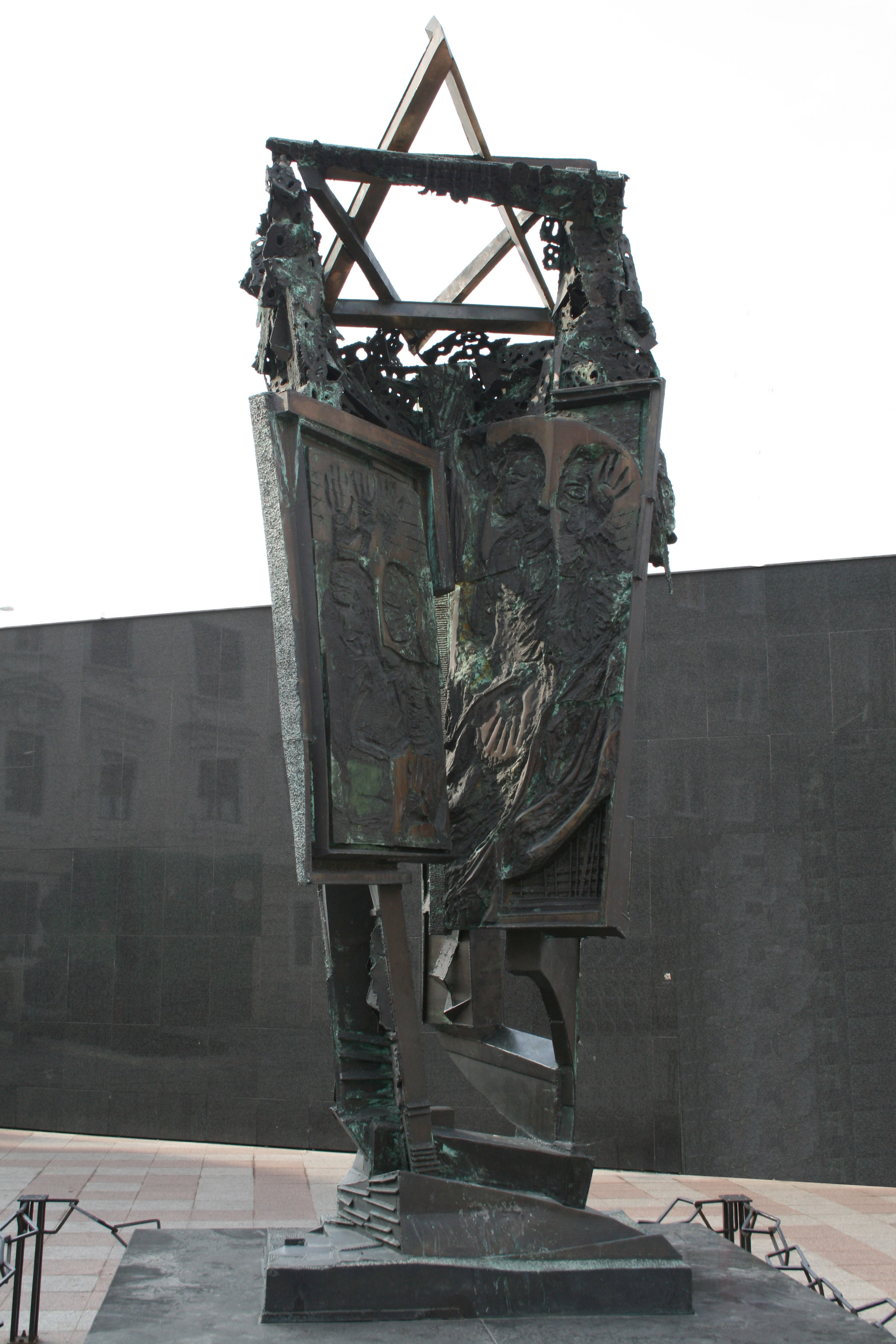
The Bratislava Holocaust memorial.

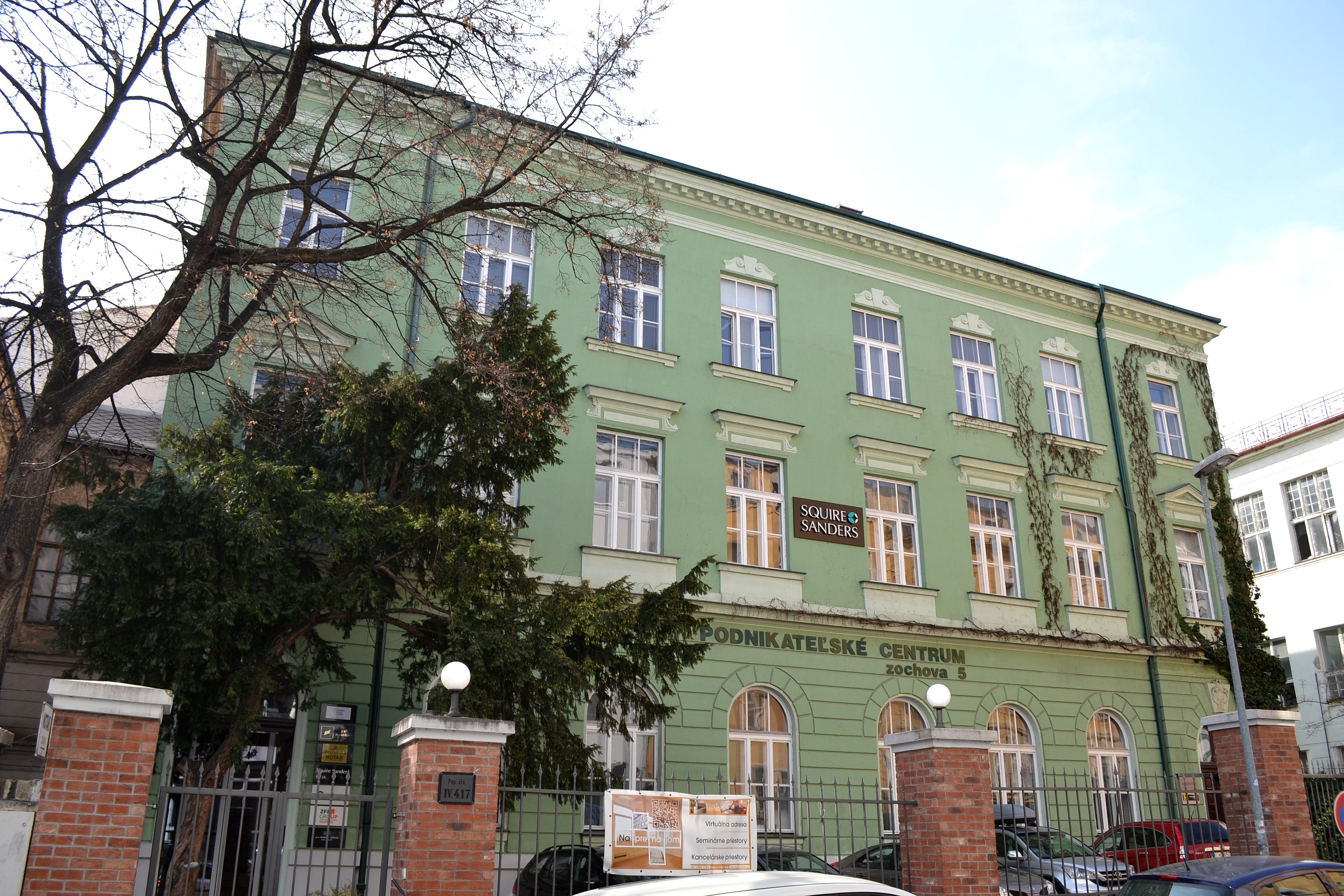
Former Orthodox Jewish school from 1899.

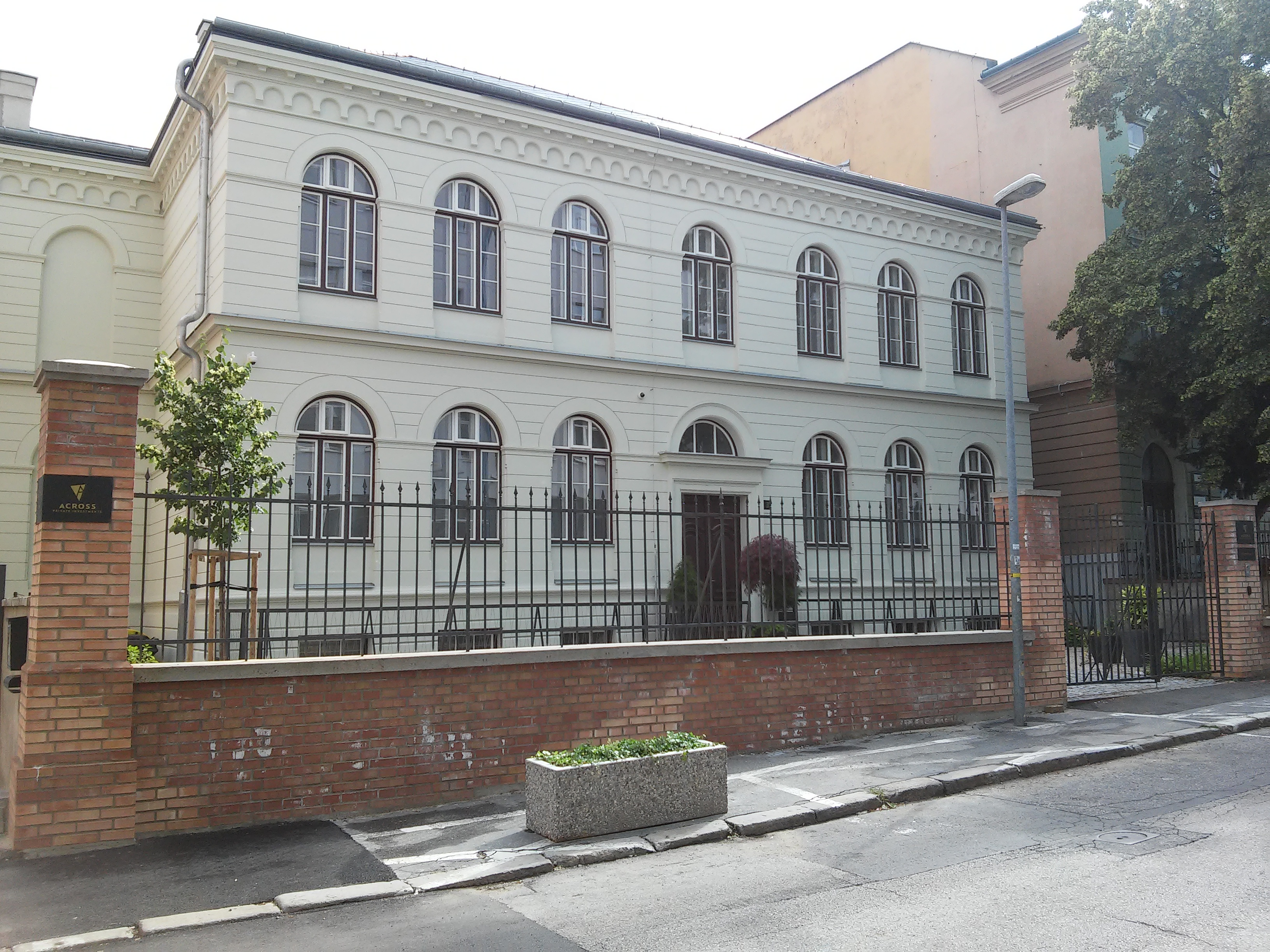
Former Neolog Jewish school from 1892.

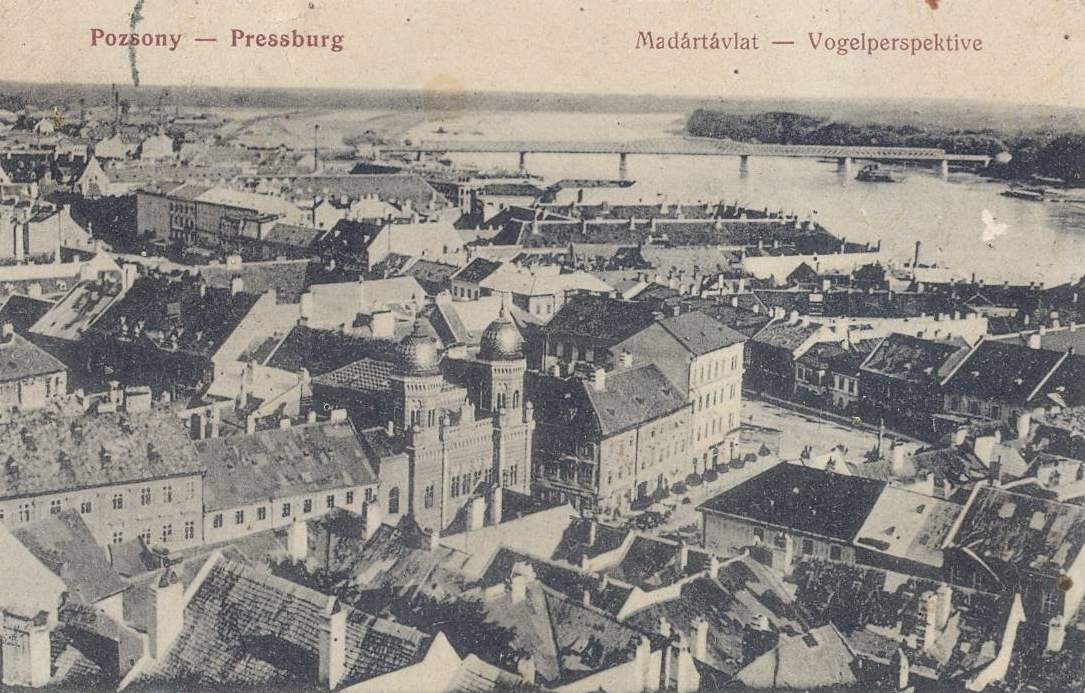
Part of the former Jewish quarter including the Bratislava Neolog Synagogue as seen in 1914.

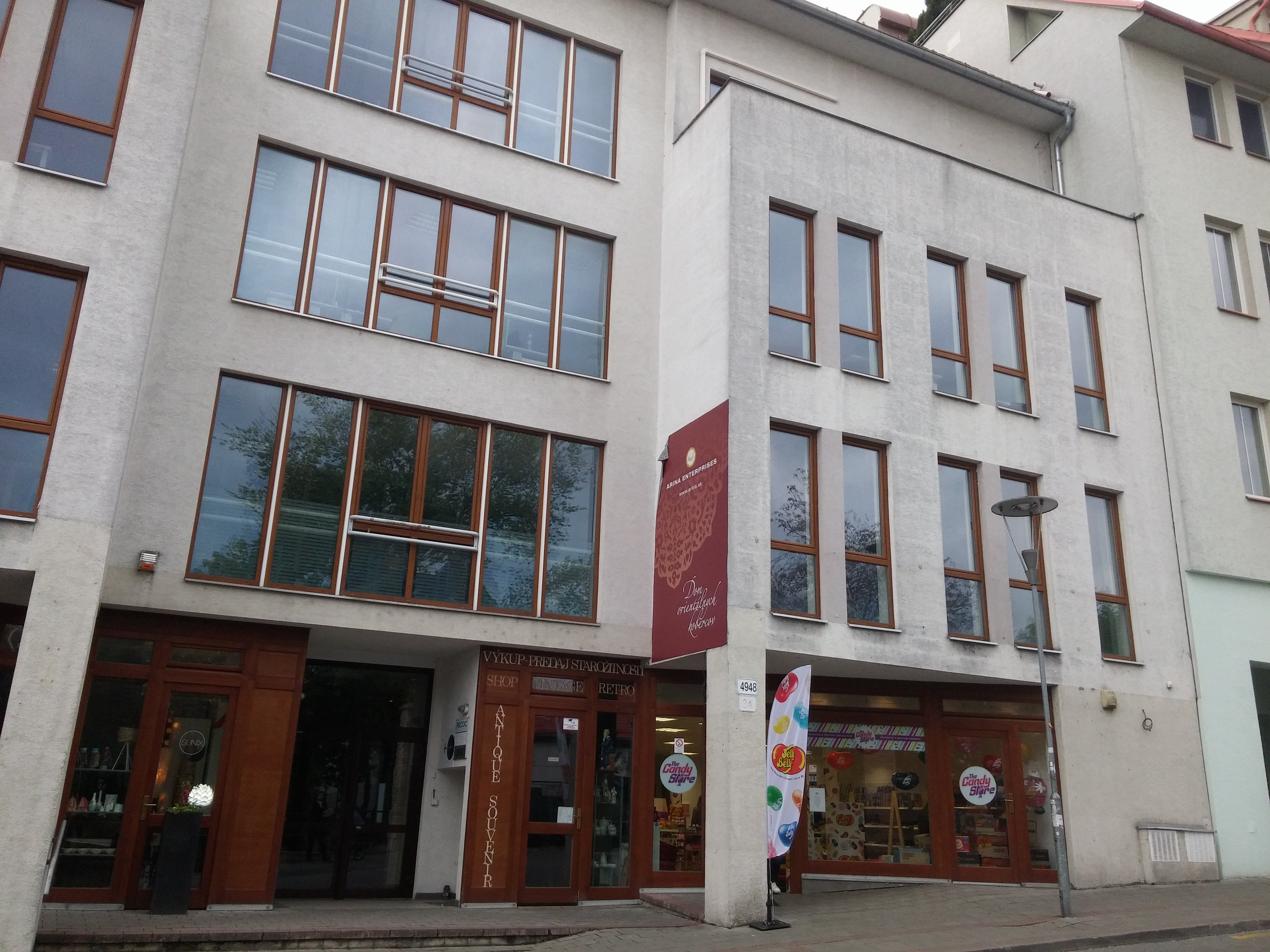
Place of the Bratislava Orthodox Synagogue that was demolished in the early 1960s.

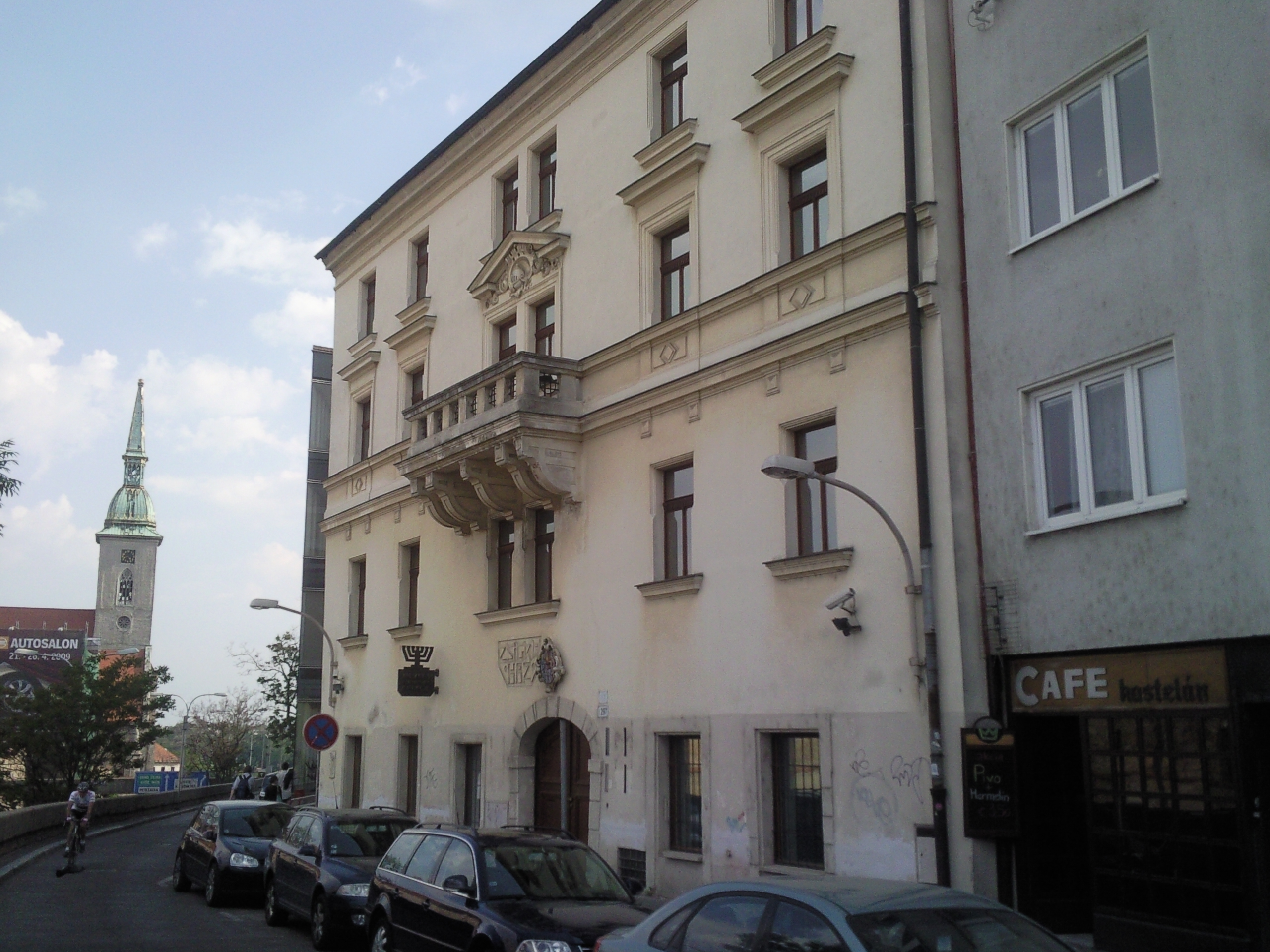
The Museum of Jewish Culture.

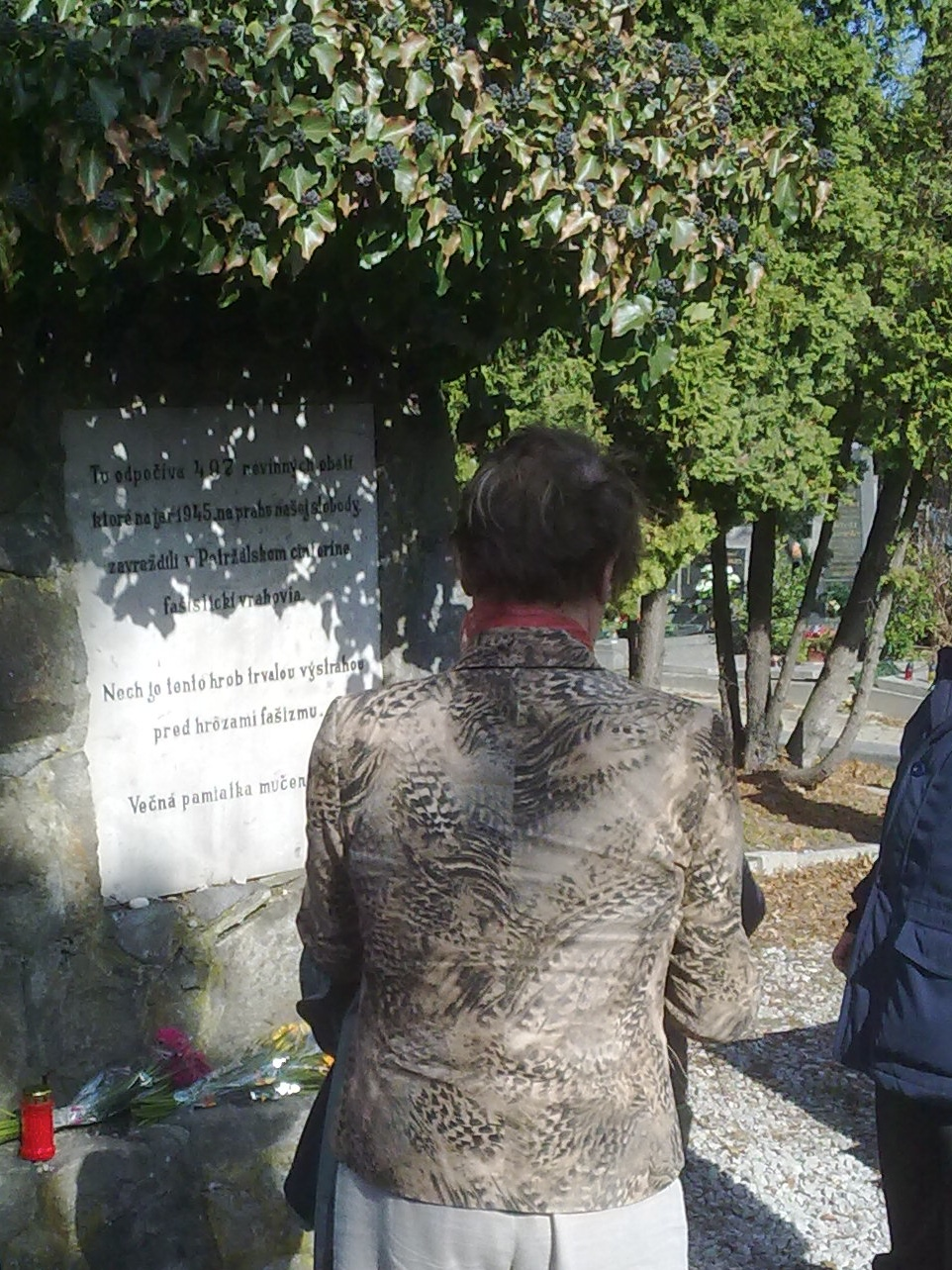
Mass grave of 497 Hungarian Jews from the concentration camp Engerau in Petržalka.

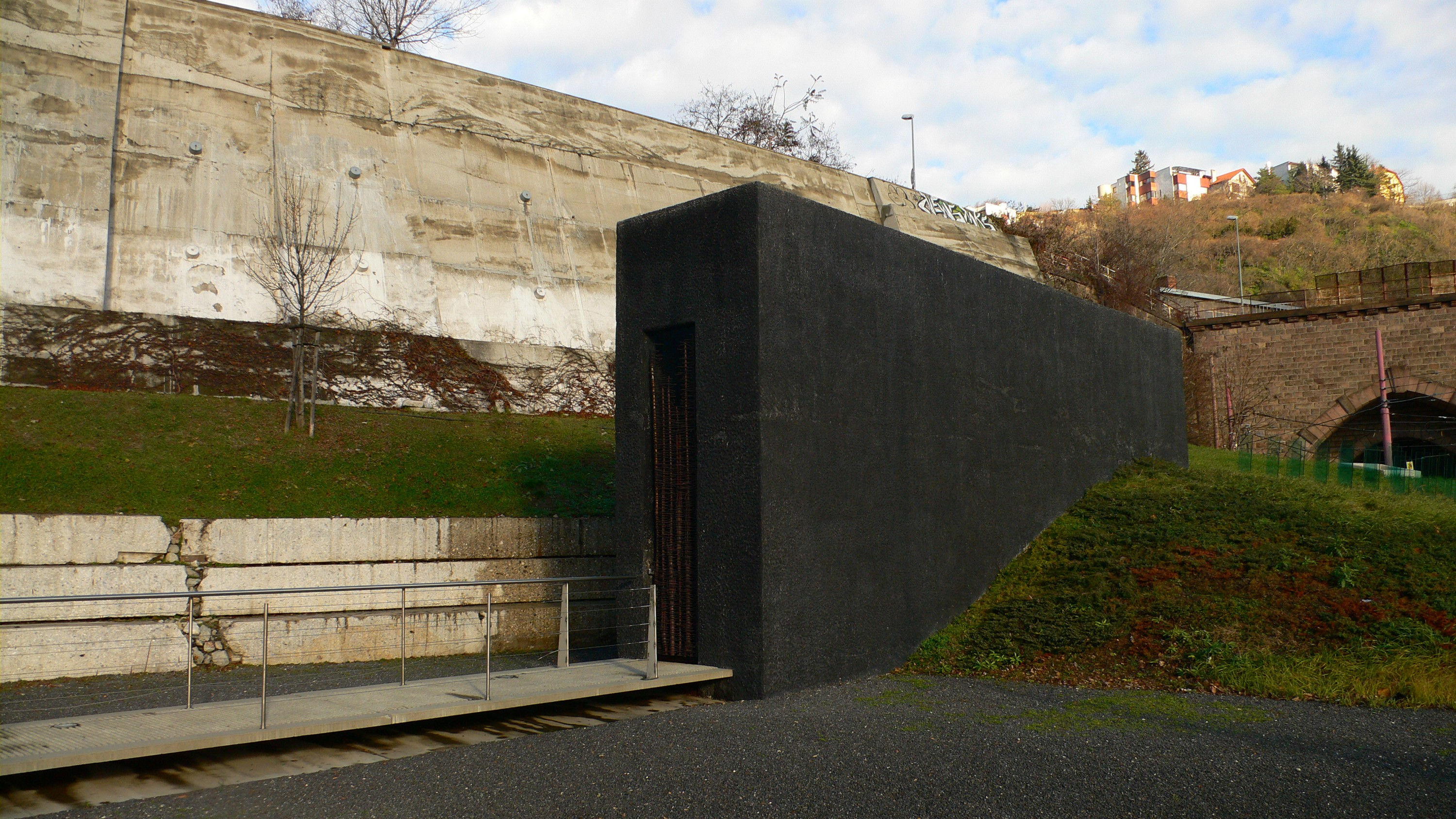
The Chatam Sofer Memorial.

== See also ==
- History of the Jews in Slovakia
- History of the Jews in Hungary
- History of the Jews in Czechoslovakia
- History of Bratislava
- Chatam Sofer

== Bibliography ==
- Egon GÁL, Peter SALNER: Sprievodca židovskou Bratislavou. Bratislava : Zing Print, 2000.
