= Vladimír Godár =

Slovak composer (born 1956)

Vladimír Godár (born 16 March 1956, in Bratislava) is a Slovak classical and film score composer. He is also known for his collaboration with the Czech violinist, singer, and composer Iva Bittová. As an academic, he is a writer, editor, and translator of books on historical music research. He has been active in reviving the music and reputation of 19th-century Slovak composer Ján Levoslav Bella.

Godár studied composition under Juraj Pospíšil and piano under Mária Masariková at the Bratislava Conservatory. In 1979, he began work as editor of the music books department of the record label OPUS, and he taught at the Academy of Performing Arts in Bratislava from 1985.

His work is little known outside Slovakia, with much of his music released by Slovart. Amongst his compositions is a large-scale sonata for cello dedicated to the memory of Victor Shklovsky.

Godár won the 2001 Georges Delerue Award for the score of the film Landscape.

His 1998 collection of essays Heretical Quodlibets" is scheduled to be published in English by Dalkey in 2024, as part of its Eastern European Literature series.

== Selected discography ==
- Concerto Grosso and Partita; conducted by period performance specialist Andrew Parrott (original release, OPUS 9350 2090, re-released on Point Classics)
- Music for Cello, performed by Jozef Lupták; Slovart Records SR-0027
- Barcarolle – Music for Violin; Slovart Records SR-0047
- Chamber Music, performed by Albrecht Quartet, Jozef Lupták (cello), Nora Skuta (piano); Slovart Records SR-0018
- Mater – suite for female voice (Iva Bittová), choir and Baroque string orchestra. (ECM New Series 4765689)
- Moravian Folk Poetry in Songs; songs by Janáček, transcribed by Godár, performed by Iva Bittová and the Skampa Quartet. (Supraphon SU3794)
- Five arrangements of Grieg's Lyric Pieces by Godár (with sonatas by Franck and Grieg) (Naxos Records 8.550417)
