= Slovart Music =

Slovak independent music publisher

Slovart Music is an independent publisher of classical music in Slovakia. According to the company's website, it is "the oldest and largest independent music publishing house" in its country.

== Select artists (composers) ==
- Vladimír Godár
- Miro Bázlik
- Roman Berger
- Jozef Lupták
- Ivan Parík
- Amaral Vieira
- György Kurtág
- Peter Zagar

== See also ==
- List of record labels
