= Heydukova Street Synagogue =

Orthodox synagogue in Bratislava, Slovakia

- Slovak: Synagóga na Heydukovej ulici
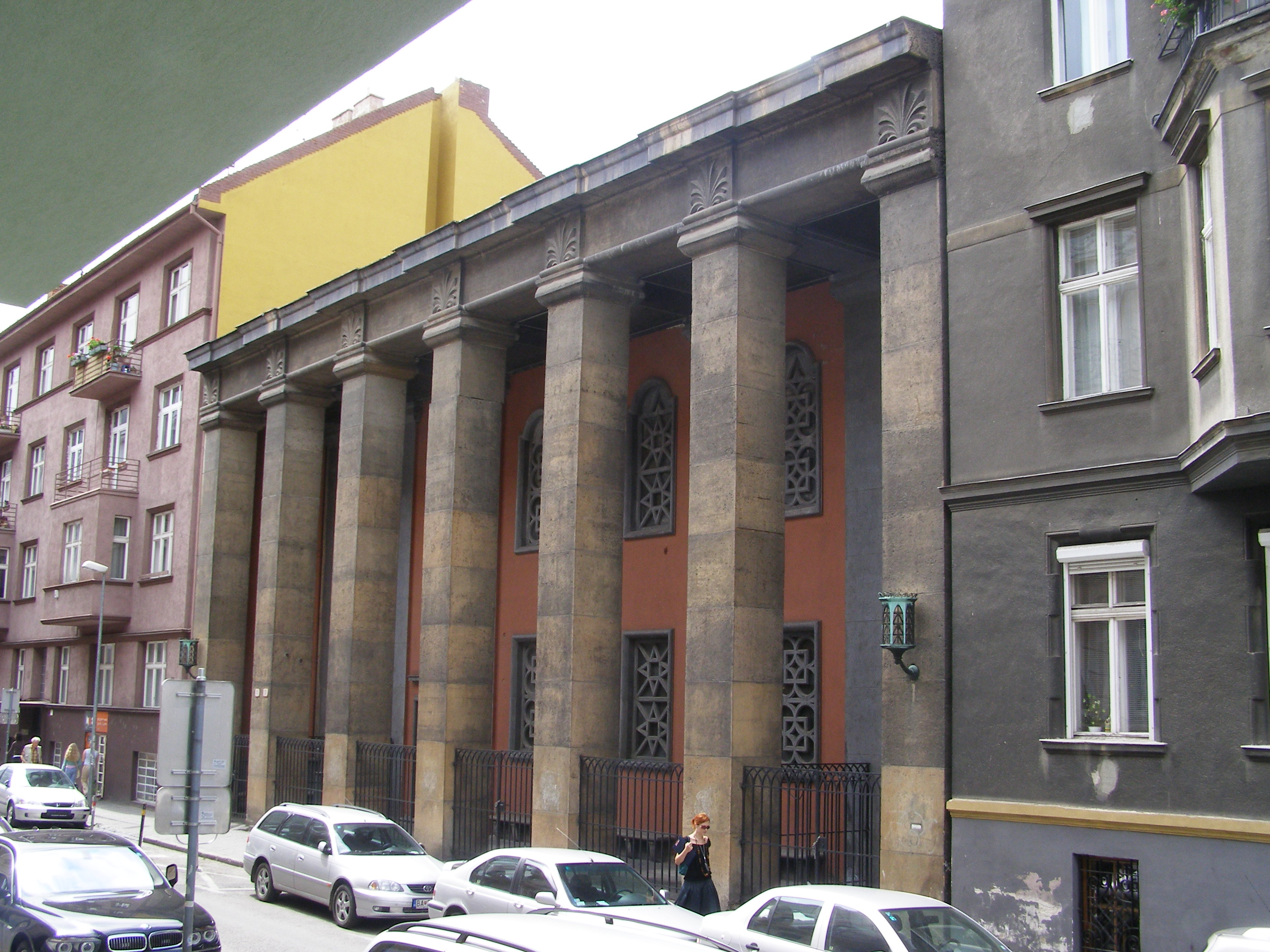
- The synagogue façade in 2007

- Location of the synagogue in Slovakia

Religion
- Affiliation: Orthodox Judaism
- Rite: Nusach Ashkenaz
- Ecclesiastical or organizational status: Synagogue and; Jewish museum
- Leadership: Rabbi Baruch Myers
- Status: Active

Location
- Location: 11-13 Heydukova Street, Old Town, Bratislava
- Country: Slovakia
- Interactive map of Heydukova Street Synagogue
- Coordinates: 48°08′49″N 17°06′44″E

Architecture
- Architect: Artur Szalatnai
- Type: Synagogue architecture
- Style: Cubism; Art Deco
- Completed: 1926
- Materials: Reinforced concrete

Website
- synagogue.sk

The Heydukova Street Synagogue (Slovak: Synagóga na Heydukovej ulici) is an Orthodox congregation, synagogue, and Jewish museum, located on Heydukova Street in the Old Town of Bratislava, the capital of Slovakia. It is the only synagogue in Bratislava.

== Synagogue history ==
Designed by Artur Szalatnai, a local Jewish architect, in the Cubist style, the synagogue was completed in 1924. The synagogue is an important example of Slovak religious architecture of the 20th century and it is listed as a Slovak National Cultural Monument. It is one of only four active synagogues in Slovakia and historically one of three in Bratislava; the other two survived World War II but were demolished in the 1960s.

The architect Artur Szalatnai was selected by winning a competition for the project of a new synagogue. It was Szalatnai's first major work after finishing studies in Budapest. At the time of the construction, there were no houses in this part of Heydukova Street.

The synagogue exterior has a towerless, seven-pillared colonnade facing Heydukova Street. Entrance is situated at the building's eastern side, from the corridor connecting the street with the inner yard. The interior includes a large sanctuary in which modern steel-and-concrete construction and contemporary Cubist details are combined with historicist elements.

== Jewish museum ==
The building also houses the Bratislava Jewish Community Museum, installed upstairs, with a permanent exhibition “The Jews of Bratislava and Their Heritage” which is open to the public during the summer season.

== See also ==
- History of Bratislava
- History of the Jews in Slovakia
- List of synagogues in Slovakia
