= Museum of Jewish Culture =

Museum in Bratislava, Slovakia

Coordinates: 48°08′39″N 17°06′13″E

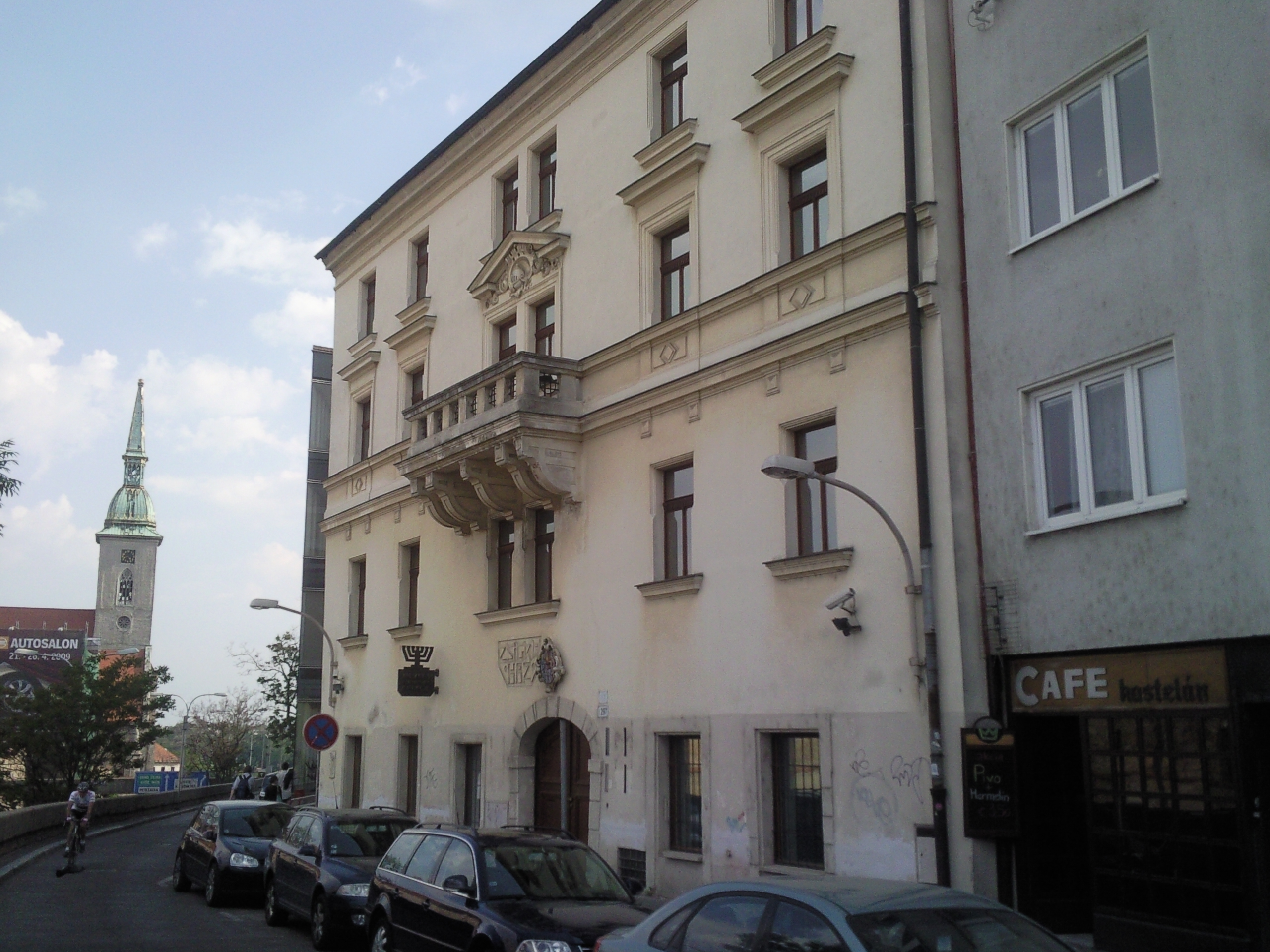
17 Židovská Street, where the museum is located

The Museum of Jewish Culture (Slovak: Múzeum židovskej kultúry) is a museum in Bratislava, Slovakia, which focuses on the history of the Jews in Slovakia. Opened in 1993, it is a component of the Slovak National Museum, and its director is Pavol Mešťan.

== History ==
The Museum of Jewish Culture began to take shape on the grounds of the SNM Historical Museum as the Department of Jewish Culture. It became an independent SNM museum with nationwide operation in 1994.

== Expositions ==
- Exposition of Jewish culture in Slovakia in the premises of the Zsigray Curia at Židovská 17 in Bratislava.
- Barkány's permanent collection of Judaica in the Prešov Synagogue.
- Synagogue in Nitra. In the women's gallery, the exhibition is dedicated to the fate of Jews in Slovakia.
- The Sereď Holocaust Museum (opened January 26, 2016) is located in the authentic premises of the former Sereď Labor and Concentration Camp.
