= Slovak National Museum =

Coordinates: 48.1402°N 17.1129°E

- Slovenské národné múzeum
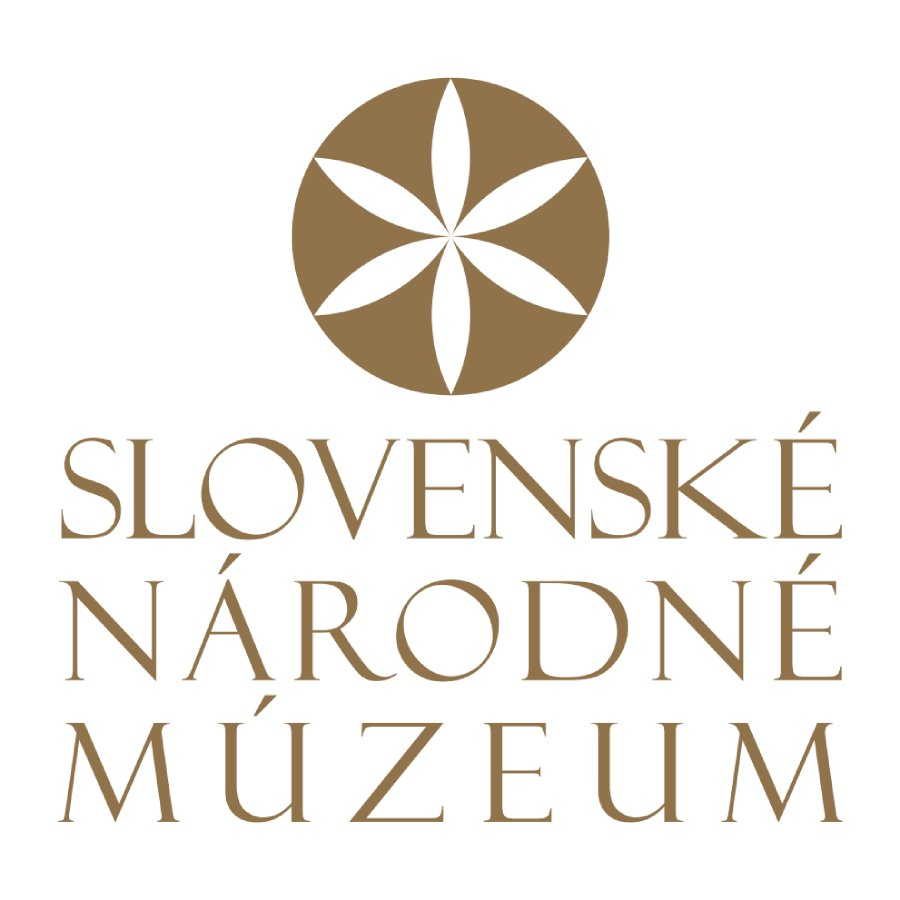

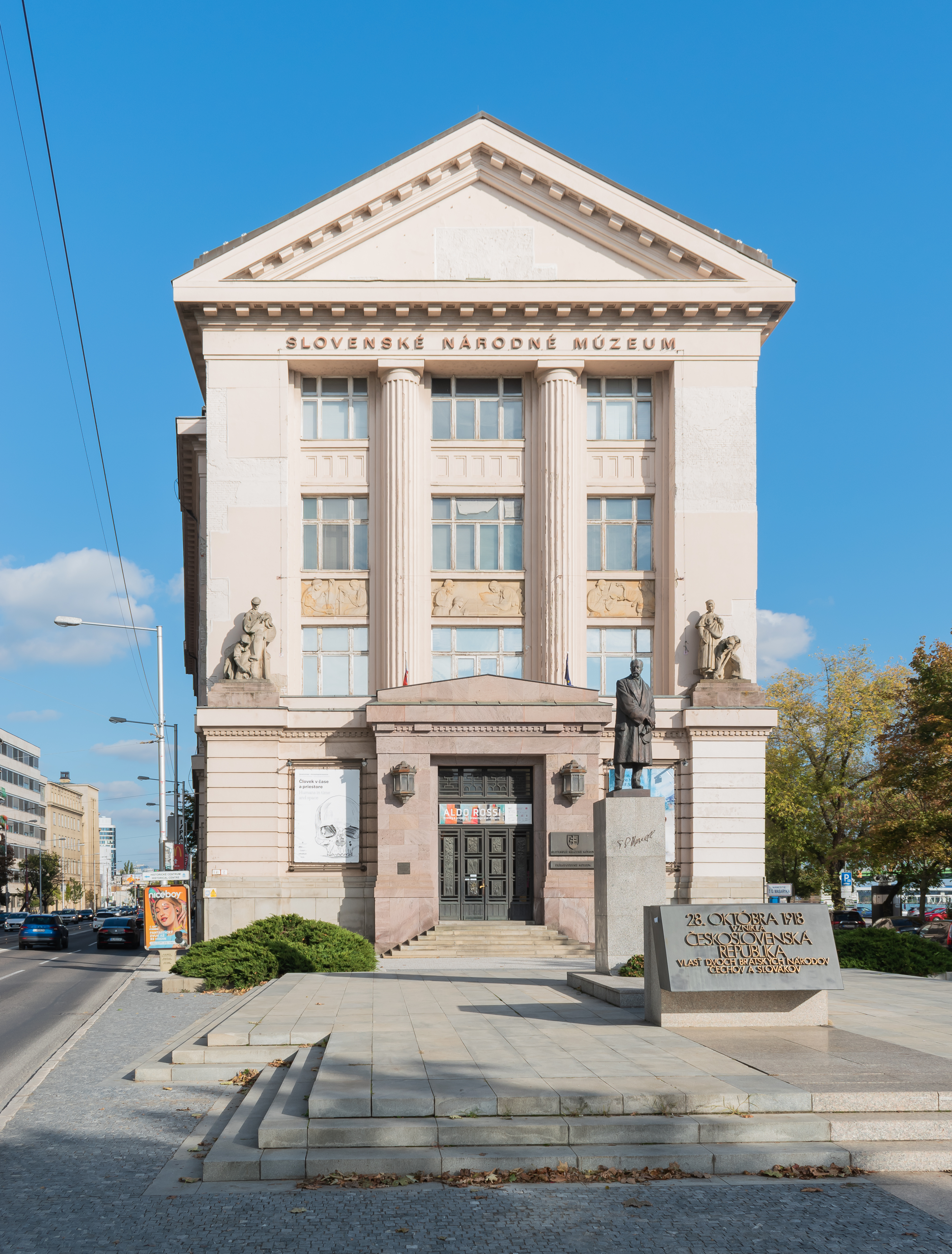
- Established: 1961
- Location: Slovakia
- Collection size: 3,894,000
- Director: Branislav Panis
- Architect: M. M. Harminc
- Website: www.snm.sk

The Slovak National Museum (Slovak: Slovenské národné múzeum) is the most important institution focusing on scientific research and cultural education in the field of museology in Slovakia. Its beginnings "are connected with the endeavour of the Slovak nation for national emancipation and self-determination".

It is headquartered in Bratislava; however, the Slovak National Museum governs 18 specialized museums, most of which are located outside the city.

== History ==
The Slovak National Museum (SNM) was established in 1961. Its origins lie in the Matica Slovenská Museum and the Museum of the National House in Martin, which developed the Slovak Museology Society. The first permanent exposition funded from a national collection was opened in Martin in 1908. The museum was building archaeological, ethnographic, historical, numismatic, art historical, creative art and natural science collections. The Slovak National Geographic and History Museum was established in Bratislava in 1924 by the Slovak National Geographic and History Museum Society. The Agricultural Museum, a department of the Czechoslovak Agricultural Museum in Prague, was established in Bratislava the same year. In 1940, the Slovak National Geographic and History Museum and the Agricultural Museum were merged into the Slovak Museum. In 1961, the Slovak Museum and the Slovak National Museum in Martin were merged into the Slovak National Museum, based in Bratislava.

On March 11, 2012, the Krásna Hôrka Castle (part of the SNM), was damaged by a fire started when two children were lighting cigarettes. The fire destroyed the roof but most of the historic collections were undamaged. The castle is expected to reopen in 2018.

== The museum today ==
The Slovak National Museum is the most important scientific research and cultural education institution, with the largest and best collections in the museological field in Slovakia. The museum is also dedicated to scientific research tasks and publishing activities. Moreover, the SNM is "a coordination, methodological, professional advisory, statistical, educational and information centre for the whole field of museology in the Slovak Republic."

=== Building ===
The Slovak National Museum's headquarters are located on Vajanské nábrežie (a river front street in Bratislava's Old Town), along with the Natural History Museum. The construction of the building, designed by architect M. M. Harminec, began in July 1925 and was completed in 1928. The museum opened on May 4, 1930.

== Specialized museums and departments ==
Name	Slovak name	Location
Natural Science Museum	Prírodovedné múzeum	Bratislava
Archaeological Museum	Archeologické múzeum	Bratislava
Museum of History	Historické múzeum	Bratislava Castle
Music Museum	Hudobné múzeum	Bratislava Castle
Ethnographic Museum	Etnografické múzeum	Martin
Andrej Kmeť Museum	Múzeum Andreja Kmeťa	Martin
Museum of Slovak Village	Múzeum slovenskej dediny	Martin
Martin Benka Museum	Múzeum Martina Benku	Martin
Museum of Czech Culture in Slovakia	Múzeum kultúry Čechov na Slovensku	Martin
Museum of Roma Culture in Slovakia	Múzeum kultúry Rómov na Slovensku	Martin
Museum of the Slovak National Councils	Múzeum Slovenských národných rád	Myjava
Červený Kameň Museum	Múzeum Červený Kameň	Červený Kameň Castle
Betliar Museum	Múzeum Betliar	Betliar
Bojnice Museum	Múzeum Bojnice	Bojnice Castle
Spiš Museum in Levoča	Spišské múzeum v Levoči	Levoča
Museum of Puppet Culture and Toys	Múzeum bábkarských kultúr a hračiek	Modrý Kameň Castle
Museum of Jewish Culture	Múzeum židovskej kultúry	Bratislava, also on display in Trnava, Žilina and Prešov
Museum of Hungarian Culture in Slovakia	Múzeum kultúry Maďarov na Slovensku	Bratislava
Museum of Carpathian German Culture	Múzeum kultúry karpatských Nemcov	Bratislava
Museum of Ukrainian-Ruthenian Culture	Múzeum ukrajinskej kultúry	Svidník
Museum of Ruthenian Culture	Múzeum rusínskej kultúry	Prešov
Museum of Ľudovít Štúr	Múzeum Ľudovíta Štúra	Modra
Museum of Croatian Culture in Slovakia	Múzeum kultúry Chorvátov na Slovensku	Bratislava-Devínska Nová Ves

== See also ==
- List of music museums
