= Jozef Lupták =

Slovak cellist and artistic director (born 1969)

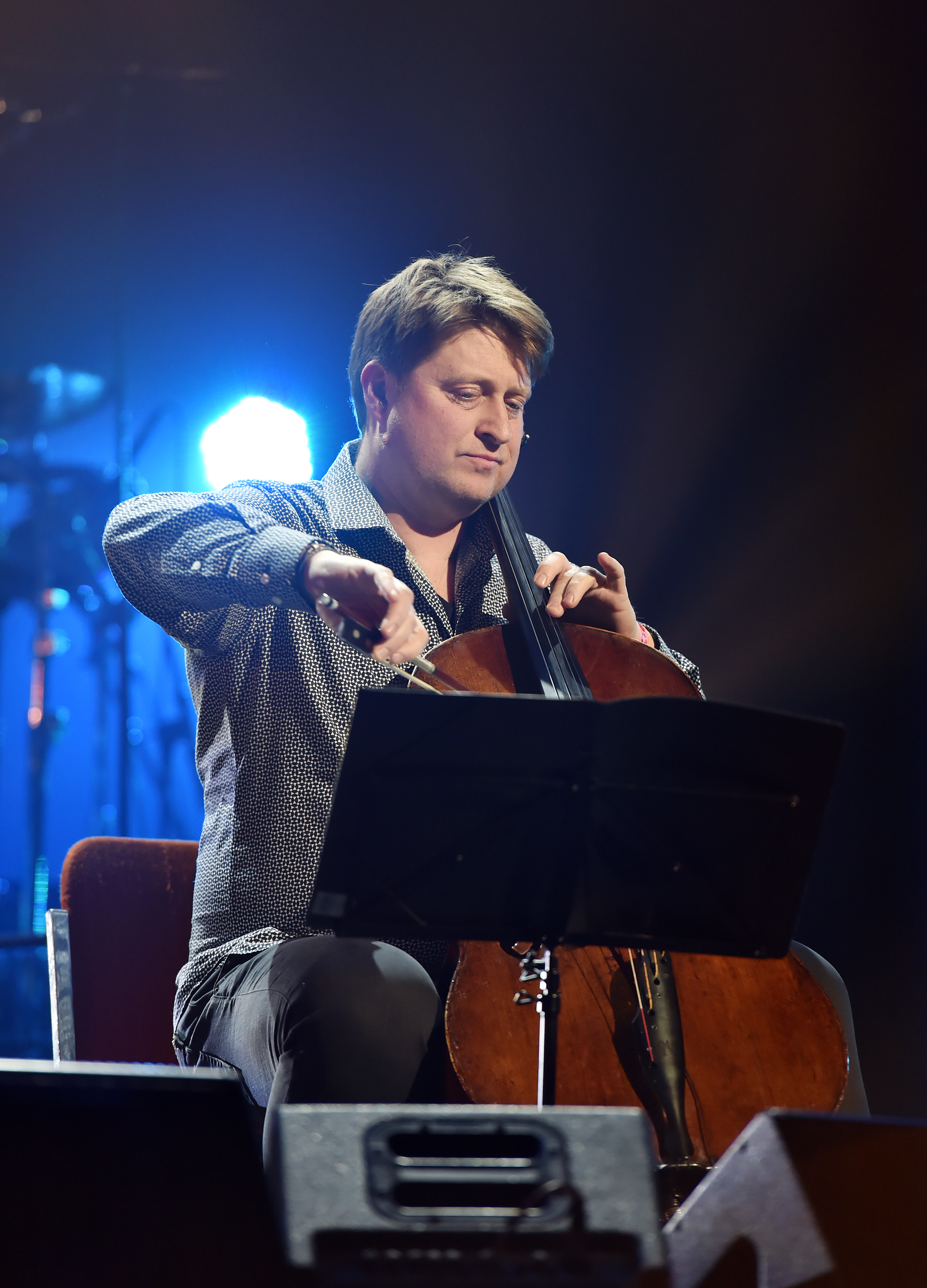
- Jozef Lupták in 2017

Background information
- Born: December 30, 1969 (age 56); Slovakia
- Genres: Classical, Chassidic, Roots revivalist
- Occupations: Cellist, Artistic Director
- Instrument: cello
- Years active: 1989–present
- Labels: Slovart Records, Various
- Website: www.jozefluptak.com

Jozef Lupták (born 30 December 1969, Slovakia) is a Slovak cellist and artistic director. He is a performer of classical and contemporary cello repertoire as well as Chassidic and Roma-Gypsy revivalist music in Eastern Europe and is the artistic director of the Konvergencie Festivals in Slovakia.

== Awards ==
- Award for Cultural Activity in Music for "After Phurikane", 2010 & 2011
- Nomination for the Crystal Wing Awards, 2010
- Frico Kafenda Award, 2009
- Award from the Minister of Culture for Success as Concert Artist & Konvergencie Festival, 2009
- May Mukle Cello Prize, Royal Academy of Music, London, 1997
- Banff Centre for the Arts, Long Term Artistic Residency, Canada, 1994
- International Cello Competition, Liezen, Austria, 1994
- International Competition for Young Cellists, Jury Prize, Murcia, Spain, 1989

== Selected discography ==
- In the space of love, Evgeni Irshai, Slovak Radio Symphony Orchestra, Slovak Music Fund, 2013
- Chassidic Songs: Chassidic Jewish Music with Rabbi Baruch Myers, Konvergencie Records, 2010
- After Phurikane: Ancient Roma Songs Anew, Zudro 2010
- Namah Chamber music by Peter Machajdík, Hudobný fond CD © 2008 SF 00542131
- Jozef Luptal-Cello Live Recital from St John's, Smith Square, Slovak Music Centre
- Cello-Bach, Jeffery, Burgr, Iršai, Zagar, Wolff, Improvisations: MI 2001
- Johann Sebastian Bach – Complete Suites for Solo Cello – BWV 1007–1012: First complete Slovak Recording, Porta Libri, 2001
- Music For Cello – Vladimír Godár: Slovart Records 1999
- Chamber Music of Vladimír Godár: Albrecht Quartet, Nora Skuta, Slovart Music 1996
- Slovak Composers (Matej, Zagar, Burlas): Veni ensemblom /Slov.hudobný fond/1992 Musica/1996
- Philip Ratliff – String Quartett: Banff Centre Label, 1994
- Brahms – Sonate F dur, Hindemith – Solo Sonate, M.Burlas- Agónia: with pianist Nora Skuta, OPUS Records, 1994
