= Baruch Myers =

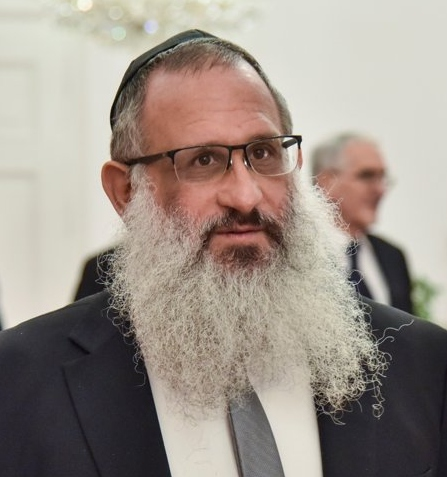
- Born: May 2, 1964 (age 62); Orange, New Jersey
- Education: University of Michigan; Rabbinical college of America
- Occupations: Rabbi & Chabad emissary in Bratislava, Slovakia
- Title: Rabbi
- Term: 1993
- Predecessor: Rabbi Izidor Katz
- Spouse: Chana Myers (1989-present)
- Website: Chabad of Slovakia

Rabbi Baruch Myers (born May 2, 1964, in Orange, New Jersey) is a Chabad-Lubavitch Hasidic rabbi. He began his service in Bratislava in 1993. He serves as the Chief Rabbi and head Shliach of Slovakia.

== Biography ==
Baruch Myers was born in Orange, New Jersey and raised in Maplewood. Myers married Chana Myers in March 1989 and moved to Bratislava, Slovakia in 1993. He was inaugurated on June 20, 1993, as Bratislava's Chief Rabbi, the Jewish community's first rabbi in 15 years since the last rabbi of Bratislava Izidor Katz died in December 1978 (former rabbi of Galanta). In addition to serving as the community's official Rabbi he currently has a Chabad house where he hosts programs, activities, and services for the local Jewish community and tourists, a Jewish kindergarten (cheder), in the afternoons, and a summer camp. Myers lives with his wife and 13 children in Bratislava and runs Chabad of Slovakia there. He organised a Chassidic Songs Project with Slovak cello player Jozef Lupták.
