= Slovak National Uprising =

1944–45 anti-Nazi armed resistance

- Part of the Eastern Front of World War II
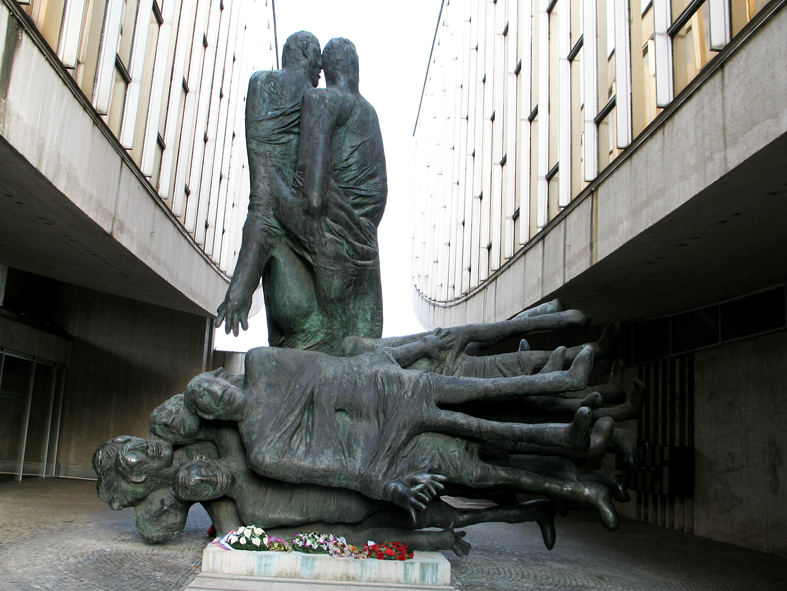
- Monument to the National Uprising in Banská Bystrica
Date	29 August – 28 October 1944 (2 months)
Location	Slovakia
Result	German–Slovak victory; Uprising suppressed; Transition of the insurgents to partisan warfare

Belligerents
Germany; Slovakia	1st Czechoslovak Army in Slovakia; Partisan movements French Volunteers; Supported by: Soviet Union; United States; United Kingdom

Commanders and leaders
(Nazi Germany) Gottlob Berger (Nazi Germany) Hermann Höfle (Slovak Republic (1939–1945)) Ferdinand Čatloš (defected) (Slovak Republic (1939–1945)) Štefan Haššík (Slovak Republic (1939–1945)) Otomar Kubala	(Czechoslovak government-in-exile) Ján Golian (POW) (Czechoslovak government-in-exile) Rudolf Viest (POW)

Strength
In total: 50,000 German soldiers 6,900–8,600 Slovak soldiers 5,000 Hlinka guardists	In total: 60,000 rebelling soldiers 7,000–18,000 partisans

The Slovak National Uprising (Slovak: Slovenské národné povstanie, abbreviated SNP; alternatively also Povstanie roku 1944, English: The Uprising of 1944) was an attempted insurrection organised by the Slovak resistance during the Second World War. It was directed on the one hand against the German invasion of Slovakia by the Wehrmacht, which began on 29 August 1944, and on the other against the Slovak collaborationist regime of the Ludaks under Jozef Tiso. It was one of the largest uprisings against Nazism and its allies in Europe.

Carried out by parts of the Slovak army, the main area of the uprising was in central Slovakia, with the town of Banská Bystrica as its centre. The Slovak insurgent army (officially the 1st Czechoslovak Army in Slovakia) was under the overall command of a military headquarters of the opposition Slovak National Council. This represented a coalition of the civic Democratic Party and the Slovak communists and was linked to the Czechoslovak government-in-exile in London. The uprising was additionally supported by Soviet and Slovak partisan units. At the beginning of the uprising, the insurgents controlled over half of what was then Slovak territory, but quickly lost ground as a result of the German advance. After 60 days of fighting, the uprising ended on 28 October 1944. With the fall of Banská Bystrica, the military leadership of the insurgents gave up fighting openly against the Wehrmacht. Without surrendering, the insurgents switched to pure partisan fighting, which they continued until the Red Army liberated Slovakia from Nazi control in April 1945.

As a result of the uprising, both conflicting parties also committed numerous war crimes. In the areas controlled by the insurgents, up to 1,500 people were murdered (mostly members of the German minority). The German occupation regime, for its part, claimed up to 5,000 lives (about 2,000 of them being Jews), especially after the suppression of the uprising with targeted "punitive measures" against the civilian population. The German leadership also used the uprising as an opportunity to complete the extermination of the Jews in Slovakia, which resulted in the deportation or murder of more than 14,000 Jews on Slovak territory by the end of the war. A total of about 30,000 Slovak citizens were deported to German prison, labour, internment and concentration camps.

After the communist takeover in Czechoslovakia in 1948, the Slovak National Uprising underwent strong reinterpretations. As a result, the share of communists and partisans in the uprising was exaggerated by official Czechoslovak historiography. The civic resistance and the significance of the insurgent army, whose representatives were persecuted by the communist leadership after 1948, were neglected. With the fall of communism in 1989, a process of re-evaluation began in Slovakia, through which the role of the civic resistance and the insurgent army was emphasised. 29 August is a public holiday in today's Slovakia.

== Background ==
=== Initial political situation ===
The Slovak Republic in Europe (1942)

On 14 March 1939, under strong pressure from the Third Reich, the Slovak Parliament declared independence from the Czecho-Slovak Republic and proclaimed the Slovak State. Slovakia's political development in the following six years was determined by its status as a "protective state" of the German Reich. In the "Protection Treaty" concluded on 23 March 1939, Slovakia strived to conduct its foreign policy and the building of its army "in close agreement" with the German Reich and to make a "protection zone" in the western part of the country available to the Wehrmacht for the establishment of military installations and garrisons. In the additionally concluded "Confidential Protocol on Economic and Financial Cooperation", Germany also secured its interests vis-à-vis the Slovak economy. In return, the German Reich strived to "protect the political independence of the Slovak state and the integrity of its territory."

Nevertheless, at the time of the state's founding, Slovakia's independence was still far from being secured. The flexibility of the German Reich in its protective obligations became apparent shortly after independence, when Slovakia was invaded by Hungarian troops and subsequently had to cede eastern Slovak territories to Horthy's Hungary. Berlin did not grant Slovakia any protection in this conflict, but merely assumed the role of mediator. In fact, for several months after the formation of the Slovak state, the German leadership was still unclear about its continued existence and regarded it as a bargaining chip in negotiations with Hungary and Poland. Since only the German government could give a guarantee of the existence of the independent state, good conduct and compliancy were therefore the order of the day among Slovak politicians, so as not to jeopardise protection by the German Reich."

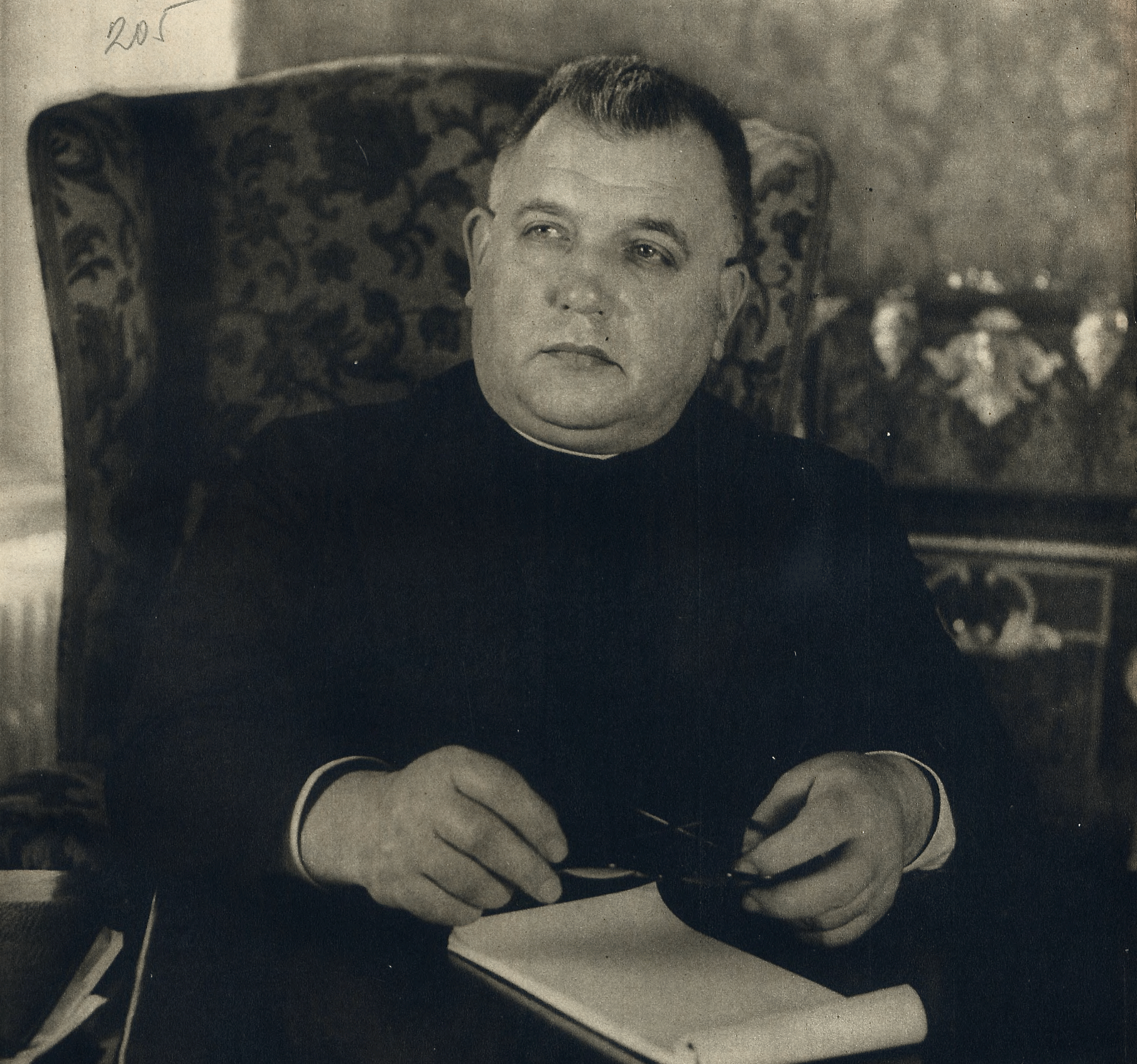
Jozef Tiso, President of Slovakia and leader of the Hlinka party (Ludaks)

The Slovak state was governed by a one-party regime of the dictatorial Ludaks. Historians sometimes classify it as fascist or – with reference to the close ties between the government and the Catholic clergy – This as clerical-fascist, (Note: Wolfgang Venohr describes Slovakia as a 'model case of so-called clerical fascism'; However, the term itself and the question of whether the regime of the Slovak state should be categorised as 'fascist' or 'clerical-fascist' are controversial among historians) but also simply as totalitarian or authoritarian. The Slovak constitution of July 1939 was modelled more on the constitutions of Salazar's Portugal and Dollfuss' Austria than on the dictatorship of the National Socialists. The domestic political situation in Slovakia from 1939 to 1942 was determined by a power struggle between the state president and party leader Jozef Tiso on the one hand and the prime minister and foreign minister Vojtech Tuka on the other. While Tuka, out of his admiration for National Socialism, entered into a voluntary relationship of instruction with the Third Reich, it was Tiso's endeavour to shield Slovak society from German influence. In return, however, Tiso was prepared to cooperate in the economic sphere, in military participation in the wars against Poland and the Soviet Union, and in the deportation of Slovak Jews. In 1942, by introducing the Führerprinzip, Tiso was able to oust Tuka and his radical party wing and subsequently establish a presidential dictatorship.

On the international political scene, the Slovak state initially established itself relatively successfully despite its limited sovereignty. Even before the beginning of the Second World War, it obtained de jure or de facto recognition by 18 states, including Great Britain (de facto, 4 May 1939) and France (de facto, 14 July 1939). After the German-Soviet Non-Aggression Pact of 23 August 1939, de facto and de jure recognition by the Soviet Union also soon followed. In total, the Slovak state was recognised by 27 states over the course of its existence.

As a result of the Salzburg Conference of 1940, Slovakia became even more closely tied to the German Reich. In November 1940, Slovakia joined the Axis powers, which led to Slovakia's declaration of war against the Soviet Union in June 1941 and against Great Britain and the United States in December 1941. Through its support of the Third Reich, Slovakia fell into ever greater international isolation and reduced its chances of a possible post-war existence, especially when the Allies adopted the restoration of Czechoslovakia as one of their wartime objectives in 1941. Since it had become apparent that the Allies would not recognise an independent Slovakia after the war, the question was no longer whether Slovakia would become part of Czechoslovakia again, but only under what conditions.

=== Collaboration regime and population ===
Flag of autonomous Slovakia (1938–1939) and the Slovak State (1939–1945)

The Ludaks of the ruling Hlinka party had already been the strongest political force in Slovakia since 1925, but within Czechoslovakia they never received more than a third of the Slovak electoral votes. (Note: This voter support relates to the entire population of Slovakia. Among voters of Slovak ethnicity, on the other hand, the proportion of voters in favour of the Ludaks was almost 50%.) In the autumn of 1938 they took over the autonomous Slovak provincial government and by December 1938 imposed a one-party dictatorship in which only the political representations of the German and Hungarian minorities remained. The other civic parties were pressured into forced unification with the Hlinka Party, and left-wing and Jewish parties were banned. Press censorship was introduced and a concentration camp for actual or alleged opponents of the regime was set up in Ilava. With its organisations – the Hlinka Guard and the Hlinka Youth – it strove to dominate all life in Slovakia. The emergence of the Slovak state was seen by many Ludaks – despite its shortcomings and limitations under constitutional law – as the completion of Slovak national-emancipatory aspirations.

Flag of the Ludaks (1938–1945)

The majority of the Slovak population also took a decidedly positive view of its new state, at least in the first years of its existence. In contrast to the Czech protectorate, Slovakia had been spared a German occupation, and in terms of domestic and cultural policy it remained largely autonomous. The restriction of civil liberties was considered tolerable (the regime's brutality was concentrated against the Jewish population) and the economy profited greatly from the war. Education, science and culture also experienced a boost. Until late summer of 1944, conditions in Slovakia were better than in neighbouring countries in Central Europe. That is why the Slovak government could rely on broad tolerance or even approval of its measures by the population for years. However, the representatives and members of the Protestant Church in particular were dissatisfied with the government. They made up about 17% of the Slovak population, were traditionally Czechoslovak-oriented and felt treated as second-class citizens by the Catholic-dominated Ludak regime. Since December 1938, only four Lutherans were represented in the Slovak parliament, and only one Protestant, Defence Minister Ferdinand Čatloš, made it into the government and the continued presidency of the Hlinka party.

Contributing to the disgruntlement of the Slovak population were the very unpopular wars against the Slavic states of Poland and the Soviet Union, in which Slovakia participated with its own troops, as well as the establishment of German advisory positions in Slovak ministries, the one-sided orientation towards Hitler's Germany and the exaggerated nationalism. Later, the Slovak regime's policy towards the Jews also met with widespread social disapproval. After the Salzburg Conference in 1940, the strengthened radical party wing of Prime Minister Tuka's Ludaks pushed through a rapid radicalisation of the so-called "solution to the Jewish question". The Jewish Code issued by the government in September 1941 completed the transition from the hitherto customary religious to the racial assessment of the Jewish question and was among the harshest anti-Semitic laws in Europe. On Tuka's initiative, two-thirds of the Slovak Jews (about 58,000) were then deported to German extermination camps between March and October 1942; of these, only a few hundred survived.

After the war situation turned against the Axis powers in the winter of 1942/43, unrest within Slovakia increased. In 1943, major news of German defeats (Stalingrad, Kursk, Italy's exit from the war) and the looming overall German defeat reached the country. Under the impression of the victories of the Red Army, but also of the spreading news of Nazi war crimes in the Soviet Union, a wave of Russophilia and Slavophilia grew in Slovak society. Thus, in the spring of 1944, Slovakia outwardly presented the image of an "oasis of peace", but internally fundamental changes and a radical change of mood had taken place in all strata of the population. Nevertheless, despite growing anti-German sentiment among the population, it took until mid-1944 for the political conditions in Slovakia to change to such an extent (as a result of the dramatic events in all European theatres of war) that the conditions for a national uprising were in place.

=== Resistance groups and formation of the Slovak National Council ===
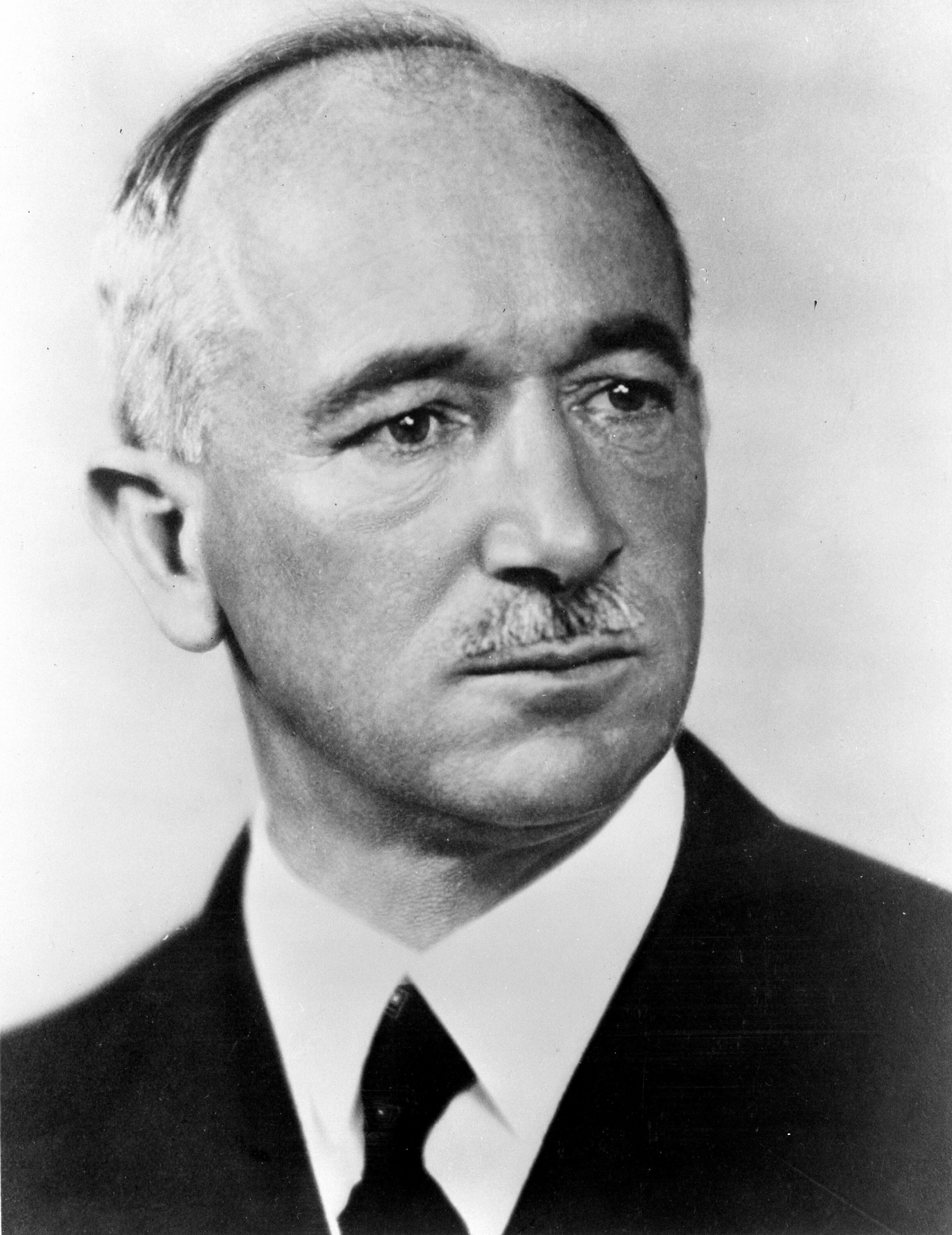
Edvard Beneš, 1940–1945 President of the Czechoslovak government in exile in London

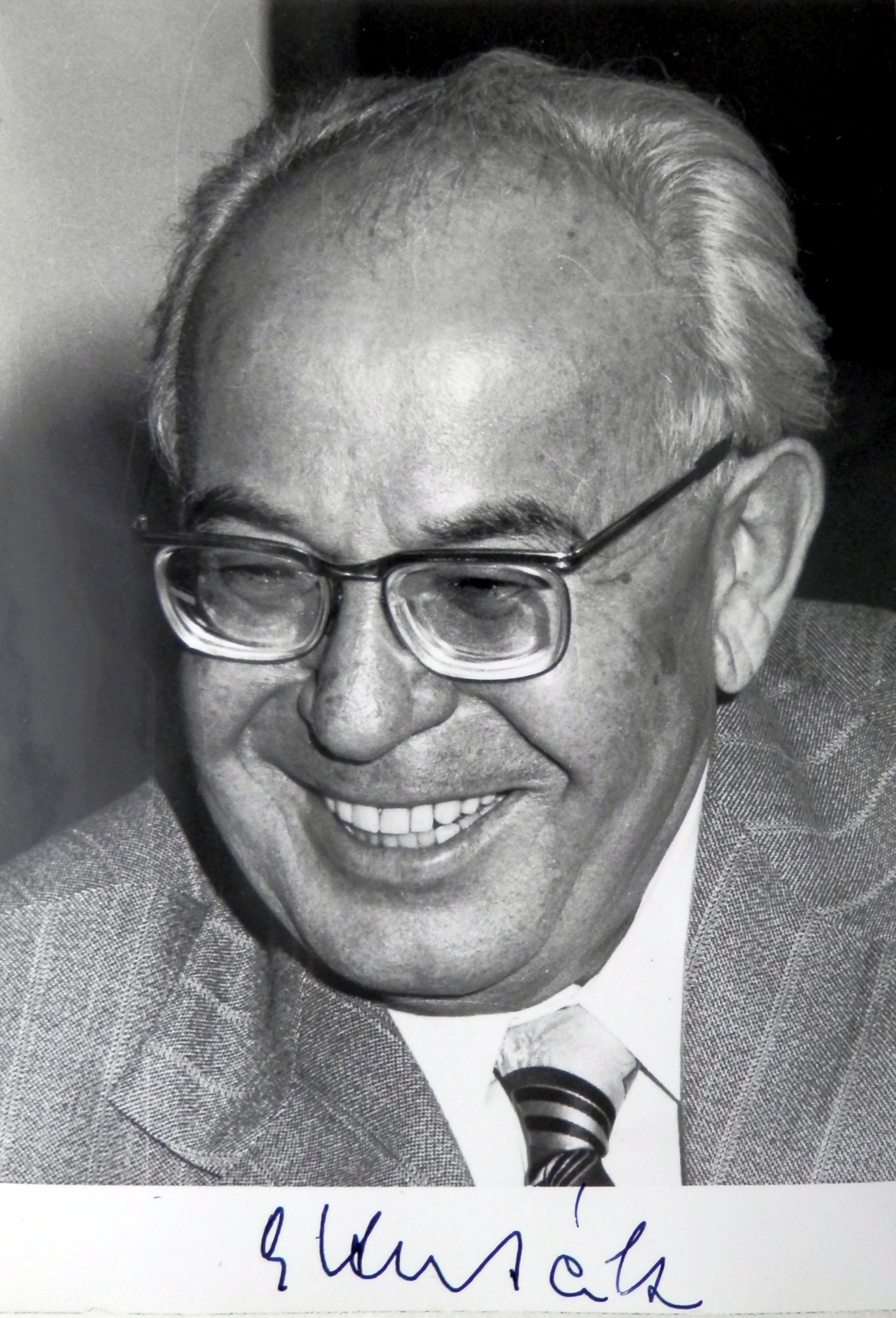
Gustáv Husák, Leading functionary of the Slovak Communists (1986)

As in several other countries, there were two main lines of political resistance in Slovakia – This one communist and one non-communist. The Communist Party of Czechoslovakia (KSČ) was the first party ever to be banned in 1938 and thus forced into illegality. After the emergence of the Slovak state, the Slovak communists became independent and the Communist Party of Slovakia (KSS) was formed. The leadership of the Czechoslovak communists defected to Moscow.

From the beginning, the Slovak communists were the main force of resistance in Slovakia and, as such, were the most fiercely persecuted. They initially became active by publishing illegal writings and coordinating strikes. Their attitude towards Slovak independence and Czechoslovakia went through several transformations and depended on Moscow's official policy. Until the recognition of Slovakia by the Soviet Union on 16 September 1939, the party leadership favoured the restoration of Czechoslovakia, after which it accepted the idea of an independent Slovakia. After 1940, the Slovak communists again made the establishment of a "Slovak Soviet Republic" their party programme. Only when Stalin recognised Edvard Beneš' Czechoslovak government-in-exile in 1941 did the KSS accept the restoration of Czechoslovakia, but demanded its federalisation.

The civic and social-democratic resistance was in contact with the Czechoslovak foreign movement and established contacts with the Czech resistance in the Protectorate. From the emergence of independent Slovakia in March 1939, civil servants and politicians who remained loyal to Czechoslovakia and Beneš formed resistance groups. They gathered intellectuals from the military and politics and helped Czech refugees from the Protectorate of Bohemia and Moravia (mostly civil servants and resistance fighters) to escape via Slovakia to the Balkans and then to the West. All these groups rejected the idea of an independent Slovakia and advocated the restoration of Czechoslovakia.

The most significant among the non-communist resistance groups were the Slovak agrarians, the majority of whom were Protestants. However, the relationship between the Slovak agrarians and Beneš was complex, due to the fact that the government-in-exile adhered to the idea of a unified Czechoslovak nation – a position that the agrarians found unacceptable. The Slovak agrarians no longer valued Prague centralism and a unified Czechoslovak nation in their ideas about a renewed Czechoslovakia. The majority of them were in favour of respecting Slovak national autonomy, from which they also derived appropriate changes in Slovakia's status under state law.

Before 1943, there was no planned cooperation between the resistance groups due to different objectives, lack of coordination and a lack of acceptance among the population. It was only due to the rapprochement between the Czechoslovak government-in-exile and the Soviet Union, as well as the course of the war, which increased the influence of the Soviet Union in East-Central Europe, that a change also began in the Slovak resistance. In 1943, the young generation of communists, led by Gustáv Husák, and the young agrarians under Ján Ursíny began to negotiate a common programme. In December 1943, the "Christmas Agreement" was reached between the "socialist block" (communists and social democrats) and the "civic block" (mainly agrarians). They agreed to stage an uprising and to form a "Slovak National Council" as the highest body of the illegal resistance, consisting of three communists (Gustáv Husák, Ladislav Novomeský, Karol Šmidke) and three non-communists (Ján Ursíny, Jozef Lettrich, Matej Josko). It was agreed to fight the Tiso regime and German domination and to re-establish Czechoslovakia as a democratic federation of two nation states in which Czechs and Slovaks would live as equal partners. In addition, political rapprochement with the Soviet Union was sought.

=== Slovak Army and Golian's Military Headquarters ===
The opposition representatives were clear that the realisation of any overthrow or uprising was unthinkable without the army. From this point of view, the involvement of the general and officer corps was decisive for the success of the action. The Slovak army had emerged from the ruins of the old Czechoslovak army, in which few Slovaks had risen to officer rank due to Czech dominance. The Slovak officer corps was built up between 1939 and 1942 – after the soldiers of Czech, Hungarian or Carpatho-Ukrainian nationality had been demobilised. The central role in building up the army was played by Ferdinand Čatloš, who became general, defence minister and commander-in-chief in one person after the establishment of an independent Slovakia.

However, the Slovak army did not become a reliable pillar of power for the Ludak regime. In general, the Slovak military was Western-oriented, and the former Czechoslovak officers had been educated in the spirit of the democratic traditions of Masaryk Czechoslovakia. Communism and an orientation towards the Soviet Union were rejected, and the Communist Party had practically no influence on the army, police and gendarmerie. The Slovak army was formally independent, but the Slovak regime had had to give up important areas of organisation, especially with the Military Economic Treaty of 1939 and the installation of the German Industrial Commission in 1943. Slovak politicians had given in to German pressure to participate in the invasion of Poland, not least because the expected that this would prevent further cessions of territory to Hungary and, in addition, that they would be able to regain the territories lost to Poland as a result of the Munich Agreement of 1938. However, since Slovaks of all political camps found it repugnant to attack the closely related Polish people together with the Germans, there were mutinies by Slovak soldiers in many Slovak towns.

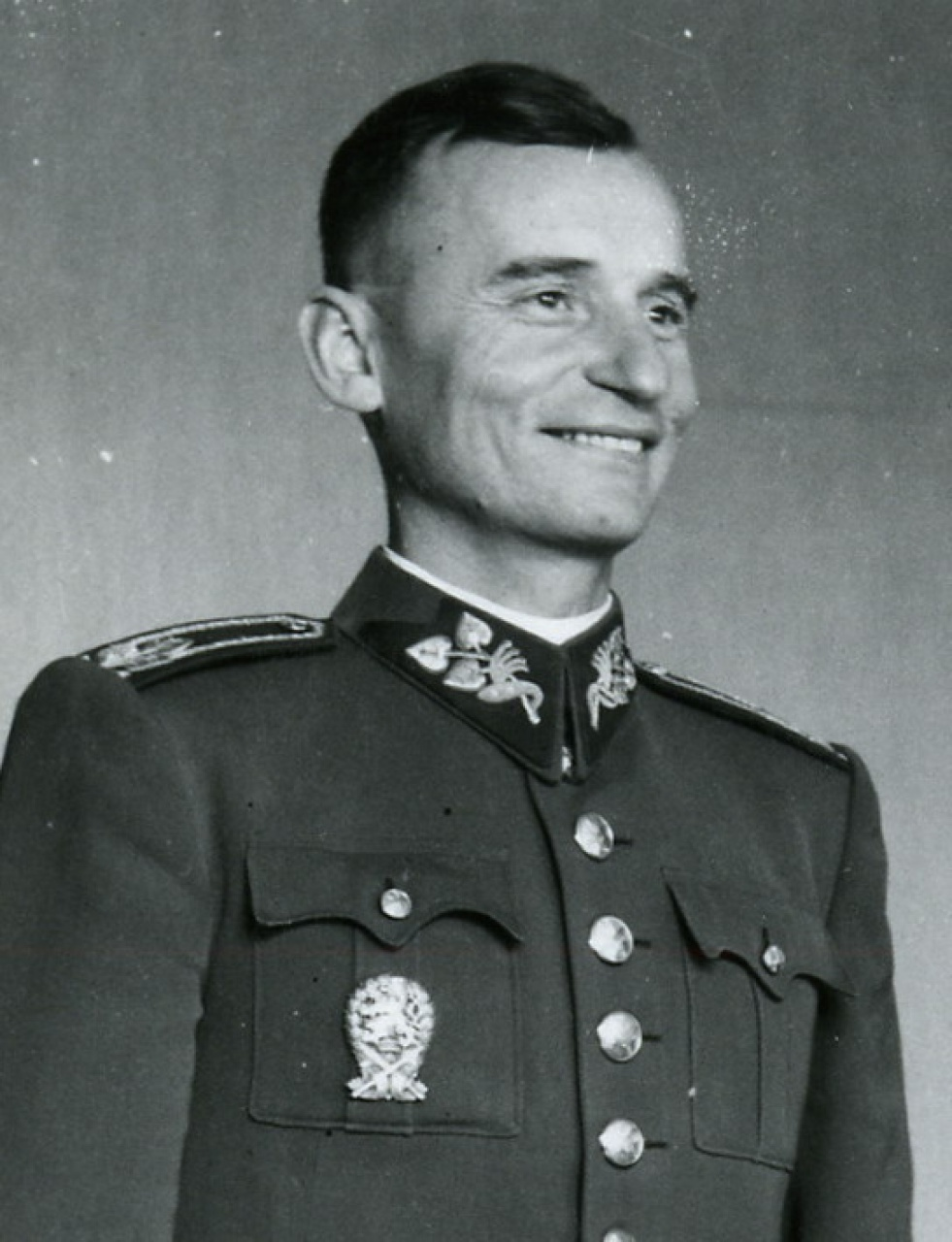
Lieutant Colonel Ján Golian, First commander-in-chief of the insurgent army.

After the declaration of war against the Soviet Union in 1941, an army of 60,000 men was sent to the Eastern Front. Until the spring of 1943, the reliability of the Slovak units had been satisfactory in German eyes; in 1942, no more than 210 Slovak soldiers had defected to the Soviet Army or the partisans. From the beginning of 1943, however, after the catastrophe of Stalingrad, the number of Slovak defectors increased by leaps and bounds. After two mass desertions of Slovak troops to the Soviets and Ukrainian partisans in October 1943, the Slovak units proved to be useless for further combat operations on the German Eastern Front.

The example of the Slovak soldiers on the Eastern Front, but above all the entire military-political situation and the situation in Slovakia led to a deep differentiation among the cadre officers of the Slovak army. Outwardly, the Slovak army was still loyal to the Tiso government, but it was riddled with discontented officers and soldiers. The most active and influential resistance group within the army was formed by four officers, including Lieutenant Colonel Ján Golian, who was transferred in January 1944 to the field army command in Banská Bystrica, where he held the exposed position of Chief of Staff. This position within the Slovak army opened up great opportunities for Golian to form a conspiratorial network in the garrisons. Against this background, Golian was entrusted by President-in-Exile Beneš with the temporary leadership of military actions in Slovakia in March 1944.

Immediately after Golian's appointment by Beneš, the illegal Slovak National Council took steps to win him over to its own platform. By contacting the army as well as subordinating Golian's pro-democracy group of officers, the Slovak National Council finally prevailed over other oppositional political groups. On 27 April 1944, after a meeting in Bratislava, two institutions central to the uprising were created: a "Military Council" at the Slovak National Council, to which Golian and another Slovak officer belonged, and a "Military Headquarters" as the supreme commanding body of an illegal insurgent army, of which Lieutenant Colonel Golian became commander.

=== Insurrection plans and diplomacy ===
After the establishment of the illegal military headquarters on 27 April 1944, the initiative in the preparations for the uprising moved completely from the Slovak National Council to the Slovak Army. Since Golian had been tied to Banská Bystrica since January 1944, the command of the field army in Banská Bystrica came to the fore in the subsequent preparations for the uprising. The military headquarters now set about making all the necessary preparations for an armed uprising in the months of May, June and July 1944. It was necessary to fill the leading command posts and staffs with reliable officers and to issue general guidelines for the troop units in the event of an uprising. It was decided to concentrate strong troop units in the central Slovak triangle of Banská Bystrica-Brezno-Zvolen. It was an area that they thought they could hold in any case, but it was also eminently suitable for an unnoticed deployment for military action.

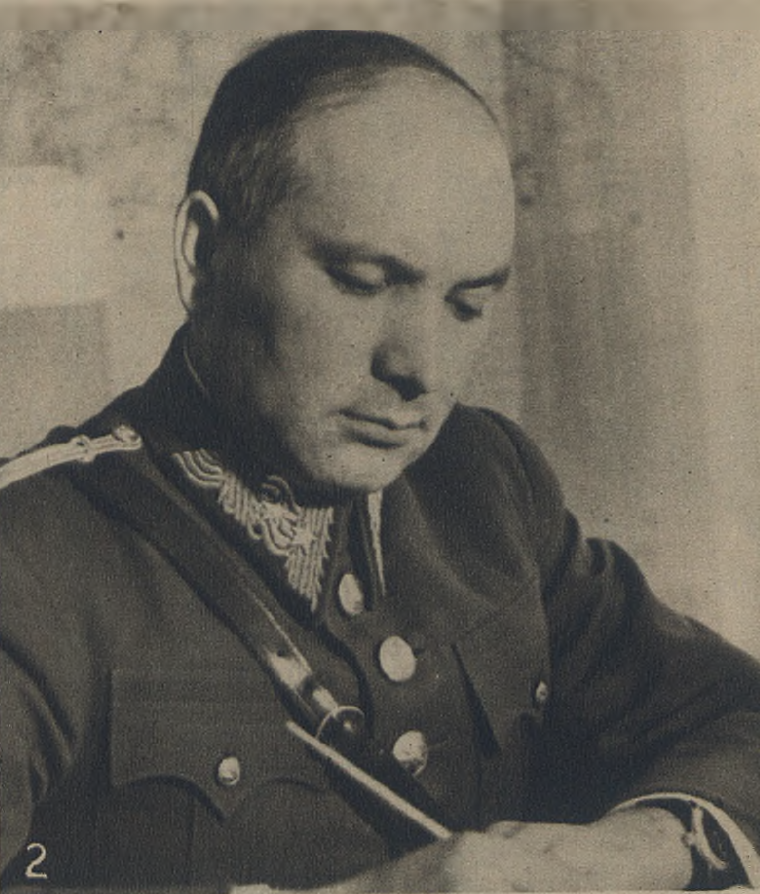
Defense Minister Ferdinand Čatloš (1941)

In both western and eastern Slovakia, the Slovak formations were under German observation. The German military mission was located in Bratislava, and the so-called German protection zone with its main base in Malacky extended directly northwest of it. Eastern Slovakia, in turn, had been declared an operational area since August 1944 at the request of the High Command of the Wehrmacht, in which the Germans enjoyed free right of passage. It thus followed naturally that mountainous central Slovakia became the glacis of the military conspiracy.

Simultaneously, but independent of the efforts of the military headquarters to work out a military insurrection plan, the Slovak defence minister Ferdinand Čatloš also developed a subversion plan of his own. Due to the changed war situation, Čatloš had already been considering a change of front since 1943, but he did not involve head of state Tiso in his plans. In early 1944, Čatloš proposed the formation of an Eastern Slovak Army (Note: In his monograph, Wolfgang Venohr refers to the Eastern Slovak Army as the 'I. Slovak Army Corps'.) that would act as one of the pillars of the future overthrow. Čatloš's proposal was approved by both the State Defence Council and the German leadership. By securing the north-eastern Slovak border with the home army, Čatloš wanted to pre-empt an occupation of this area by German units over which he would have had no influence and which would have blocked the passage of the Red Army in the Carpathians.

Čatloš planned to overthrow the Tiso government at the appropriate moment, establish a military dictatorship and lead Slovakia to the Soviet side. Unlike the Slovak National Council, however, he proposed to decide on the future status of Slovakia only after the war. Both the insurrection plan of the military headquarters and Čatloš's overthrow plan relied in principle on the exploitation of the Eastern Slovak Army to open the borders in the Carpathians and the passage of the Red Army into Slovak territory. The insurgency plan of the Military Headquarters had been the subject of continued attention and expert support from the Czechoslovak Ministry of Defence in London since July 1944, Čatloš's subversion plan, on the other hand, was not politically tied to the government-in-exile (which Čatloš did not recognise) and only to a narrow circle of insiders were privy to it until the end of July 1944.

Apart from the two so-called front-line units (1st Infantry Division in Romania and Construction Brigade in Italy), the Slovak army was effectively divided into three in April 1944. In western Slovakia, in Bratislava and the surrounding area, there were the remnants of the Ministry of Defence under General Čatloš: the Bratislava garrison with about 8,000 soldiers and other units with a strength of about 8,000 men, half of which were "military labour corps". In Central Slovakia, in Banská Bystrica and the surrounding area, replacement and training units of about 14,000 men, plus 4,000 men from the "Military Labour Corps", were concentrated around the High Command of the Land Forces under General Turanec. Last, in Eastern Slovakia, the Eastern Slovak Army took up position, comprising the two active infantry divisions No. 1 and No. 2 with 24,000 men. These men – equipped with weapons and equipment of the latest German production – could be considered the elite of the Slovak armed forces.

It was particularly important to determine the timing of the outbreak of the uprising. By the end of July 1944, the Soviet army had advanced in a narrow wedge to the Vistula River near Warsaw, thereby hastening the outbreak of the Warsaw Uprising on 1 August. However, the Soviets did not advance further into Poland at that time, thus enabling the Germans to prevent the Warsaw Uprising from succeeding. The Slovak National Council wanted to coordinate the uprising with the Soviet advance and therefore decided to send a delegation to the Soviet Union. The delegation, consisting of Karol Šmidke and a Slovak officer, managed to land in Ukraine on 4 August by plane. They carried with them both the insurrection plan of the military headquarters and the overthrow plan of General Čatloš ("Čatloš Memorandum"), who had provided them with the plane and also wanted to contact the Soviets through the delegation. They were escorted to the headquarters of the commander of the 4th Ukrainian Front, General Ivan Yefimovich Petrov, where they were first interrogated and then sent to Moscow for further interrogation. On 5 September they were allowed to return to Slovakia, but without having received any indication of Soviet operational plans or a commitment to support the uprising.

The military headquarters continued its preparations for the uprising while awaiting the return of the two envoys as well as the arrival of the Soviet army. Under the pretext of "increased participation of the Slovak army in the struggle against the Soviets", it managed to get the Tiso government to issue a decree mobilising more age groups. Under the same pretext, some units of the army were quietly transferred to the strategically important triangle of the uprising. Finally, the military headquarters transported war supplies, food and medicines to the triangle to be defended under the pretext of removing them from areas exposed to Allied bombardment (especially Bratislava). By June 1944, Central Slovakia had a full three months' worth of food supplies, all in all 1,3 million litres of petrol in various storage centres and 3,54 billion Slovak crowns in the Bank of Banská Bystrica.

=== Disruptive partisan movement and escalation of the situation ===
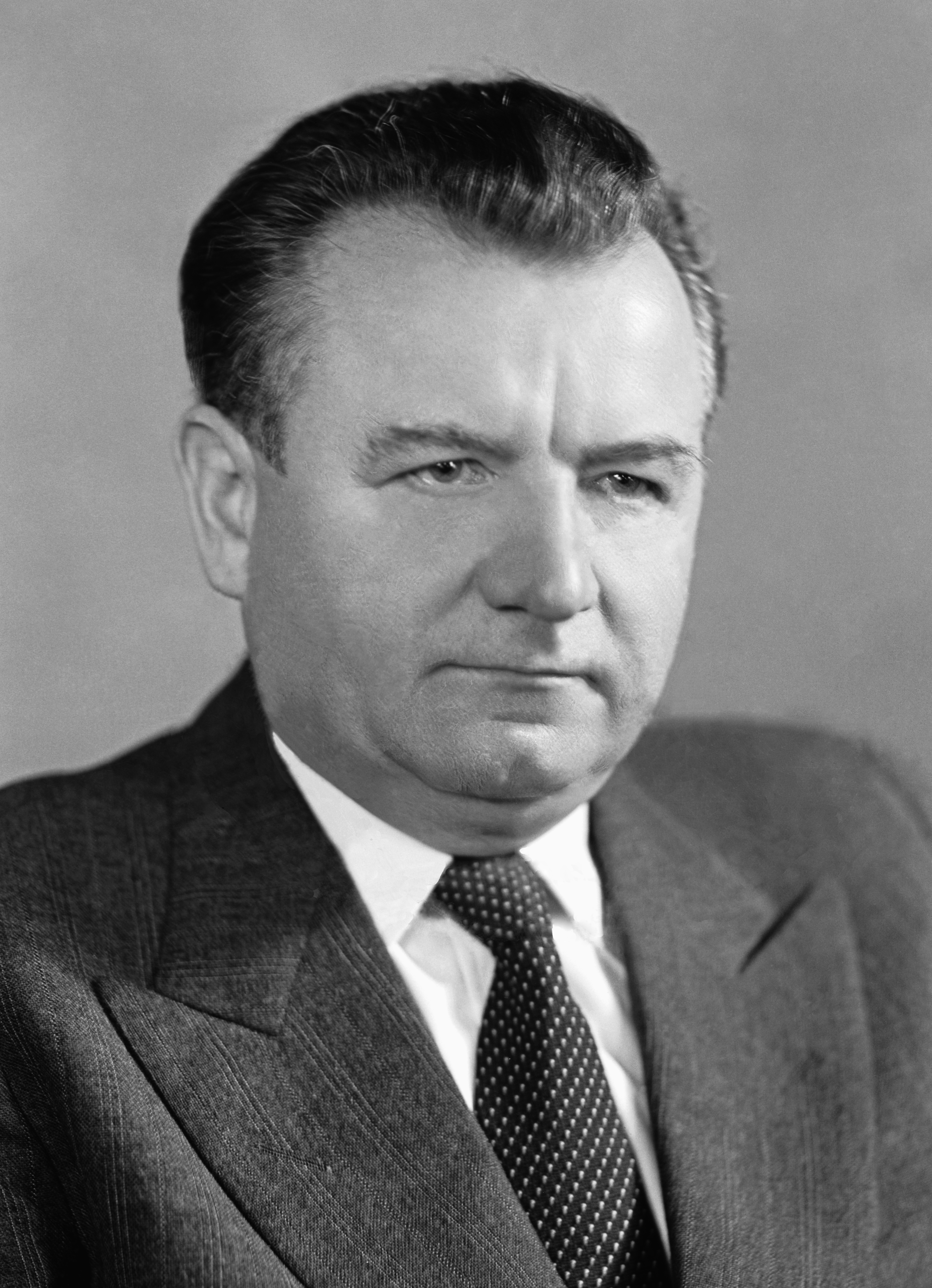
Klement Gottwald, Czechoslovak Communist Party leader and later dictator of Czechoslovakia (1948–53)

After the fiasco in the attempted coordination of the insurrection plan with Moscow, the situation in Slovakia itself also became more complicated. This was due to the Soviets and the partisans they sent. The partisan movement in Slovakia took two forms – domestic and imported, the latter being clearly more significant. The first domestic attempts to form armed groups in the forests took place as early as 1942, and was called for mainly by the Slovak communists. The partisan units formed in the mountainous areas of central and northern Slovakia. They were composed of deserters from the Slovak army, escaped prisoners of war, persecuted Jews, as well as Slovak and Carpathian German opponents of the government. However, partisanship did not take on a mass form in the first, "victorious" period for Germany and the Slovak regime, and the armed groups were isolated from the population. A genuine partisan movement did not develop in Slovakia until August 1944.

In May 1944, Klement Gottwald, the chairman of the Communist Party of Czechoslovakia in Moscow, concluded an agreement with Nikita Khrushchev, then general secretary of the Ukrainian Communists, whereby the partisan movement of Czechoslovakia was subordinated to the Ukrainian partisan movement, which was directed from Kiev. Groups trained by the Soviets were dropped as paratroopers over Slovakia and some partisans also entered the country via eastern Poland. The first Soviet parachute unit was sent to Slovakia by the Ukrainian Partisan Command on the night of 25–26 July 1944 under Lieutenant Piotr A. Velichko to take command of the Slovak partisan movement and bring reinforcements to its cadres with experienced Soviet partisan fighters. With increasing activity, namely acts of sabotage and raids on police stations, the partisans became more and more popular. Their exact numbers are disputed among historians: Wolfgang Venohr assumes about 2,000 partisans at the beginning of the uprising, whose count then increased to 7,000 due to influxes. Other historians, however, state 12,000 to 18,000 partisans as the assumed maximum number.

The relationship between the partisans and the Slovak National Council was far from ideal. Despite repeated warnings from the Slovak National Council and military headquarters that the Slovak army was preparing for a major uprising and needed all functioning communication routes for this, the partisans continued to destroy roads, railways and bridges. They also attacked Germans living in Slovakia, as well as people who were active in the party and state apparatus of the Ludaks. The increasing partisan actions disrupted the coup preparations and drew the attention of the Slovak and German services to the centre of the conspiracy in central Slovakia. Warnings from the Slovak National Council that such actions could lead to a German occupation of Slovakia and thus to a premature outbreak of the uprising were not heeded by the partisans.

In addition to the partisan problem, from mid-August onwards there was also a tendency for ever larger sections of the Slovak army not only to sympathise with the liberation organisation but also to defect to it. Although the new commander-in-chief of the army, General Turanec, attempted to restore the government's authority with repressive measures on 26 August, the step was taken too late, as the political leadership in Bratislava had long since lost the loyalty of the army. The activities of the partisans, who were often supported by the Soviet Union, and the Slovak army, which was increasingly judged to be unreliable, made Slovakia an unstable variable within the German hegemonic sphere.

The precautions taken by the Slovak government against the partisans not only remained ineffective, but the resistance groups even increased their actions against the German minority and the armed forces of the German Reich. Therefore, the German envoy in Bratislava, Hanns Ludin, saw himself forced to request the dispatch of Wehrmacht units to fight the partisans. However, the military situation in all theatres of war did not permit any intervention by the Wehrmacht for the time being, and after a temporary calming of the situation Ludin also withdrew his request for the dispatch of German troops on 27 August, as the political situation no longer seemed to justify such a measure. As a result, an incident occurred during the night of 27 August in the central Slovak town of Martin, which led to the escalation of the tense situation and triggered the German intervention.

== The Uprising ==
=== Martin Incident and the Outbreak of the Uprising ===
Romania's defection from the German to the Soviet side, successfully carried out by Romanian King Michael I on August 23, caused consternation in Berlin and fear that Romania's example would be imitated in the other German satellite states of East Central Europe. In Slovakia, Romania's change of front made a great impression, as it was the first time a satellite state in Southeastern Europe had defected from Germany. On August 27, in Martin, Slovakia, an alliance of partisans under the Soviet partisan leader Velichko and the mutinous local garrison of the Slovak Army, without the knowledge of the military headquarters, held up a train on which the German military commission in Romania was returning to Berlin after Romania's defection from Bucharest. The 22 German officers (Note: According to Martin Lacko, there were 24 officers, according to Anna Josko a total of 28 members.) were arrested and all of them were shot the next morning by the mutinous government troops on Velichko's orders.

It was primarily the fact that the Slovak army was involved in the Martin incident, but also the increasing disloyalty of many units to the government in Bratislava, that set in motion a swift and harsh reaction by the German Reich. The German Reich Foreign Minister, Joachim von Ribbentrop, asked the German envoy, Ludin, to immediately persuade the Slovak government to give its official consent to the German invasion. Ludin then met (again) with President Tiso and more or less categorically demanded his approval of the German occupation, to which Tiso agreed after much hesitation. Steps toward intervention in Slovakia, however, had already been taken by the Wehrmacht before the Slovak leadership had asked Berlin for military support. The intervention of German troops in Slovakia, already considered in the weeks before, was now put into action. Just 24 hours after the Martin incident, the first improvised units of the Wehrmacht moved into Slovakia.

An extremely complicated situation had arisen for Golian and his co-conspirators. They had no news of the outcome of the Šmidke mission and did not know the attitude of the Soviet Union. Nor had the Czechoslovak government-in-exile in London heard a word from the Soviets about their attitude toward the plans for a Slovak national uprising during more than three weeks that had elapsed since the Šmidke delegation arrived in the USSR. Moscow remained silent. Golian's efforts to delay the day of the uprising until he had news from the Soviet Union and could coordinate his military measures with the Red Army were now all doomed to failure. Added to this was that, on Hitler's orders, because of the acute danger of the Soviet advance, the Eastern Slovak Army had already been assigned to the German Army Group North Ukraine on August 1, 1944. This was a scenario that had not been anticipated at all in the original planning of the uprising. For Defense Minister Čatloš, too, the realization of the uprising according to his plans had become unrealistic since he had been deposed as commander-in-chief of the army on August 25.

On the evening of August 29 – only a few hours after the first German advance units had crossed Slovakia's northeastern border – Defense Minister Čatloš, on President Tiso's orders, read his proclamation to the army and population on Bratislava radio, according to which the Slovak government had called the German Wehrmacht into the country to fight the partisans and that the Slovak army should not offer any resistance to the Germans. Forty-five minutes later, the military headquarters in Banská Bystrica informed all garrisons scattered throughout Slovakia via telephone to resist the Germans. The Slovak National Uprising thus began as a response to the invasion of the German occupation units.

=== Initial situation and disarmament actions ===
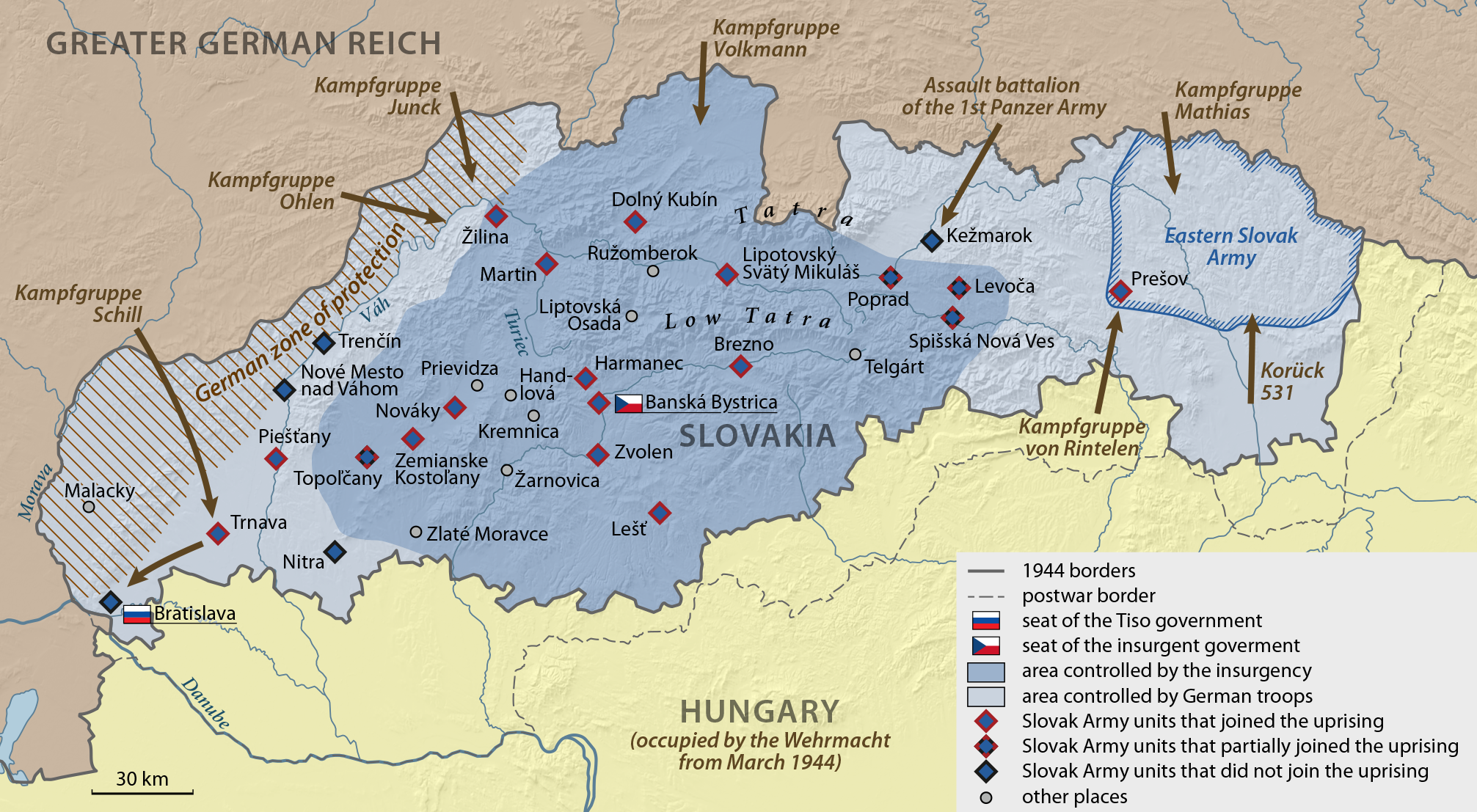
The situation during the first days of the uprising

In the first days of the uprising, the insurgents' territory covered about 22,000 km², more than half of Slovakia's territory at the time, and with a population of 1.7 million, about 64% of Slovakia's total population. On the recommendation of the London government-in-exile, the leadership of the insurgent army issued an order as early as 30 August declaring its units to be an integral part of the Czechoslovak armed forces. On 7 September, the US, the Soviet Union and the United Kingdom officially recognised this status. Thus, on 30 August, the military headquarters transformed itself into the "Command of the Czechoslovak Army" (Veliteľstvo československej armády, VČSA for short). The Slovak troops forming the core of the armed uprising were given the name "Czechoslovak Army in Slovakia" (Československá armáda na Slovensku, ČSAS for short) and on 30 September were renamed "1. Czechoslovak Army in Slovakia" (1st ČSAS). This army was regular from day one, had its command staff, regiments, battalions and companies, carried weapons, uniforms and adhered to international military law.

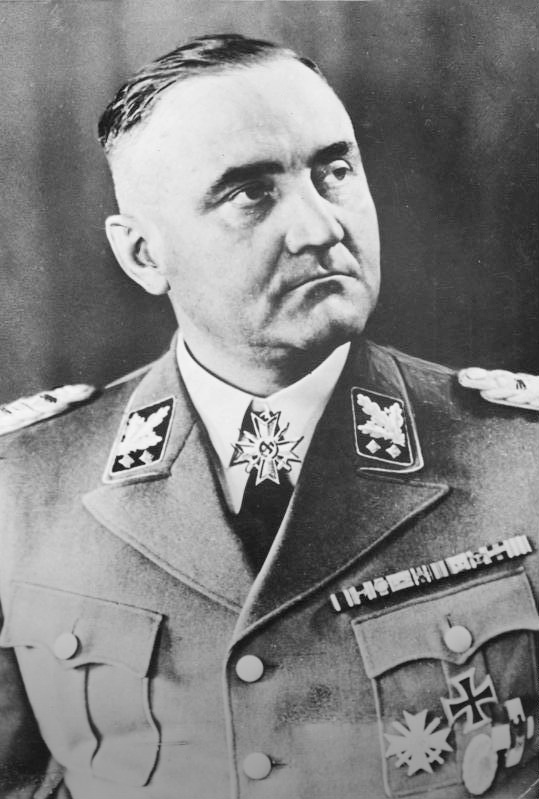
SS-Obergruppenführer Berger, First commander-in-chief of the German occupying forces in Slovakia (Deutscher General in der Slowakei)

The 1st Czechoslovak Army initially had 18,000 men; after mobilisation on 5 September 1944, their numbers rose to 47,000 and afterwards to around 60,000. At its head was Lieutenant Colonel Ján Golian as professional commander, who was promoted to colonel in early September and then to brigadier general. Their headquarters were in Banská Bystrica.

German troops gradually invaded Slovakia in the late summer of 1944 with nearly 50,000 men, and the "sovereign" and "friendly" state became a theatre of war. The country was divided into two independent military areas: while in the eastern part of the country the Army Group North Ukraine led the implementation of the action, the command over the rest of the country lay with the "German General in Slovakia", who from 1 September 1944 was provided by the SS in the person of Gottlob Berger, since the action fell into the area of "partisan combat". Berger initially had just under 9,000 men at his disposal, combined in combat groups newly set up for this operation. The first units to arrive were the Kampfgruppen Ohlen and Junck on 29 August, which had about 3900 men and were combined into the 178th Tatra Division on 5 September. Since 1 September, the Kampfgruppe Schill, over 2000 strong, had been fighting in Slovakia; in addition, Major Otto Volkmann's Kampfgruppe and the Kampfgruppen Wildner and Wittenmeyer from the 14th Waffen-Grenadier Division of the SS operated on Slovak soil in the first days of September as well. With the completion of the deployment, a ring of German troops had formed around the central Slovak insurrectionary area.

The Turčiansky Svätý Martin incident not only had the effect of triggering the confrontation between the opponents too early, thus nullifying any calculation on the part of the conspirators, but above all it had the effect of putting the German side in possession of the operational initiative from the very beginning. As a result of the surprise effect, the German combat groups succeeded in almost completely disarming the hardly resisting Slovak units stationed in eastern, and western Slovakia. The greatest initial success for the Germans was the rapid disarming of the Slovak soldiers of the Eastern Slovak Army, who were probably the best equipped and best trained. In the original insurrection plans, Golian and the Slovak National Council had assigned the main role to these units. The disarmament of the Eastern Slovak divisions, which had been prepared by the command of Army Group North Ukraine since 27 August, lasted two days and was completed on 31 August 1944. Half of the total of 25,000 Slovak soldiers were disarmed and interned, some escaped and fled to their families or joined the partisans. Only about 2,000 soldiers reached the insurgents' territory in central Slovakia. Considerable stocks of weapons and military equipment, including artillery, fell into German hands. The Germans won another early victory in western Slovakia, as the strong garrisons of Bratislava and Nitra did not join the uprising. Only the military garrison of Trnava in western Slovakia defected to the insurrection area with 3,000 soldiers.

=== First Defence of the Insurgent Army and Soviet Offensive ===
After the initial successes, the German general in Slovakia was convinced that the "expiatory action" would only take four days to pacify the country in the sense of the "protecting power". Unaware of the actual situation, Berger believed that the raids and actions against the German forces would be carried out exclusively by partisan groups. However, the attack of Kampfgruppe Ohlen, even before it reached the operational objective of Martin, came to a halt due to stubborn Slovak resistance and unfavourable terrain conditions near Žilina. This first Slovak defensive success had a positive effect on the fighting morale of the insurgents, so that the advance of all German units slowed down considerably and, in some cases, even came to a complete standstill. While the advances of Kampfgruppe Ohlen got bogged down in the Slovak defences, Kampfverband Mathias was able to advance successfully to the north and north-east towards Ružomberok and threatened the important central Slovak industrial centre with its weapons factories. Kampfgruppe Schill also operated successfully in the Nitra Valley, taking Baťovany north of the district town of Topoľčany as early as 5 September, before Slovak resistance made further advance impossible. The battlegroup of Army Group North Ukraine succeeded in capturing Ružomberok one day later, so that the insurgents lost the indispensable weapons factories. Especially in the eastern part of the insurgency area, the military leadership in Banská Bystrica tried to build up a strong defensive line to prevent relinquishing any ground. This was because it hoped that a planned Red Army offensive on the Beskydy front, which ran only 120 km to the northeast, would be a quick success and thus lead to unification.

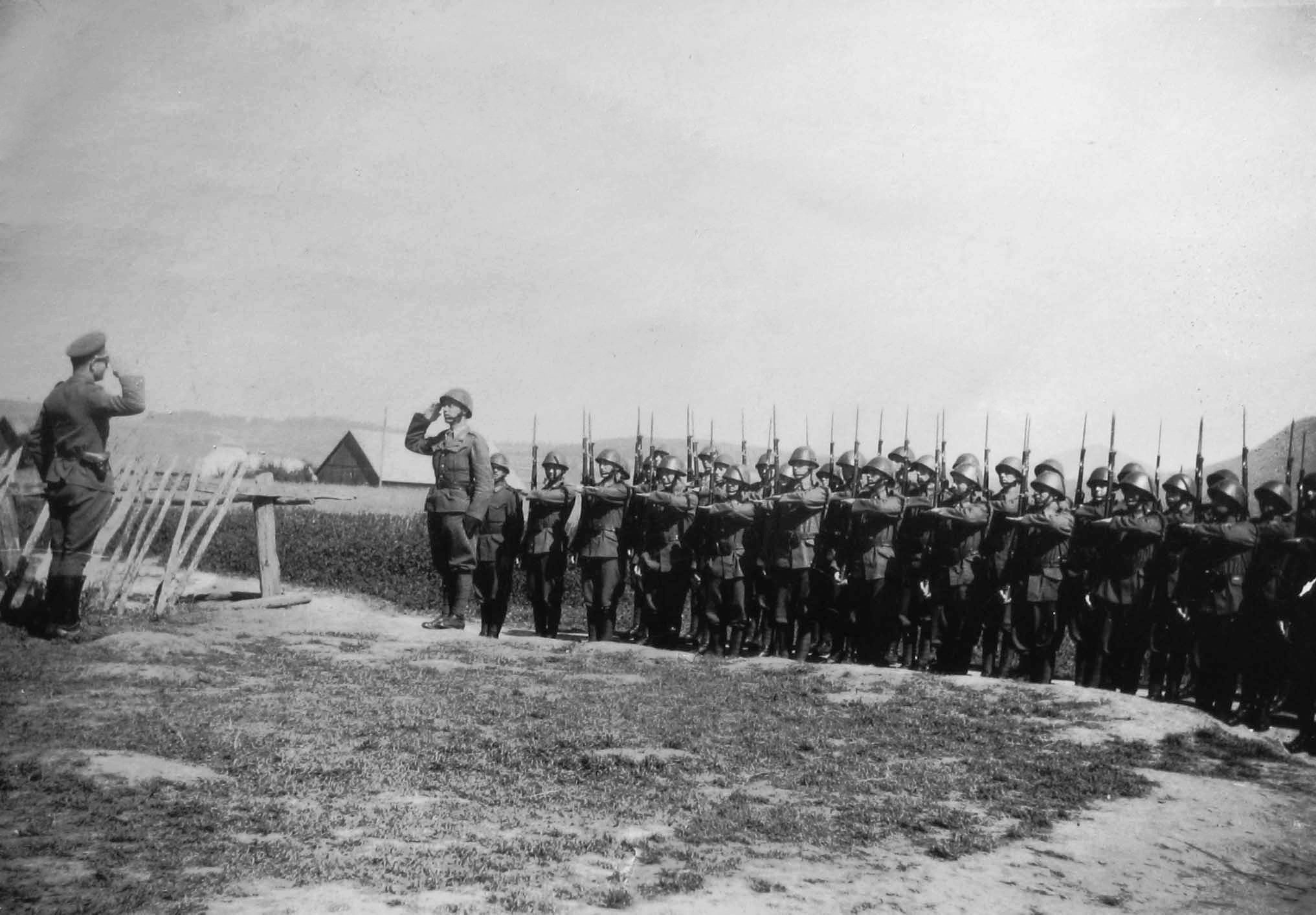
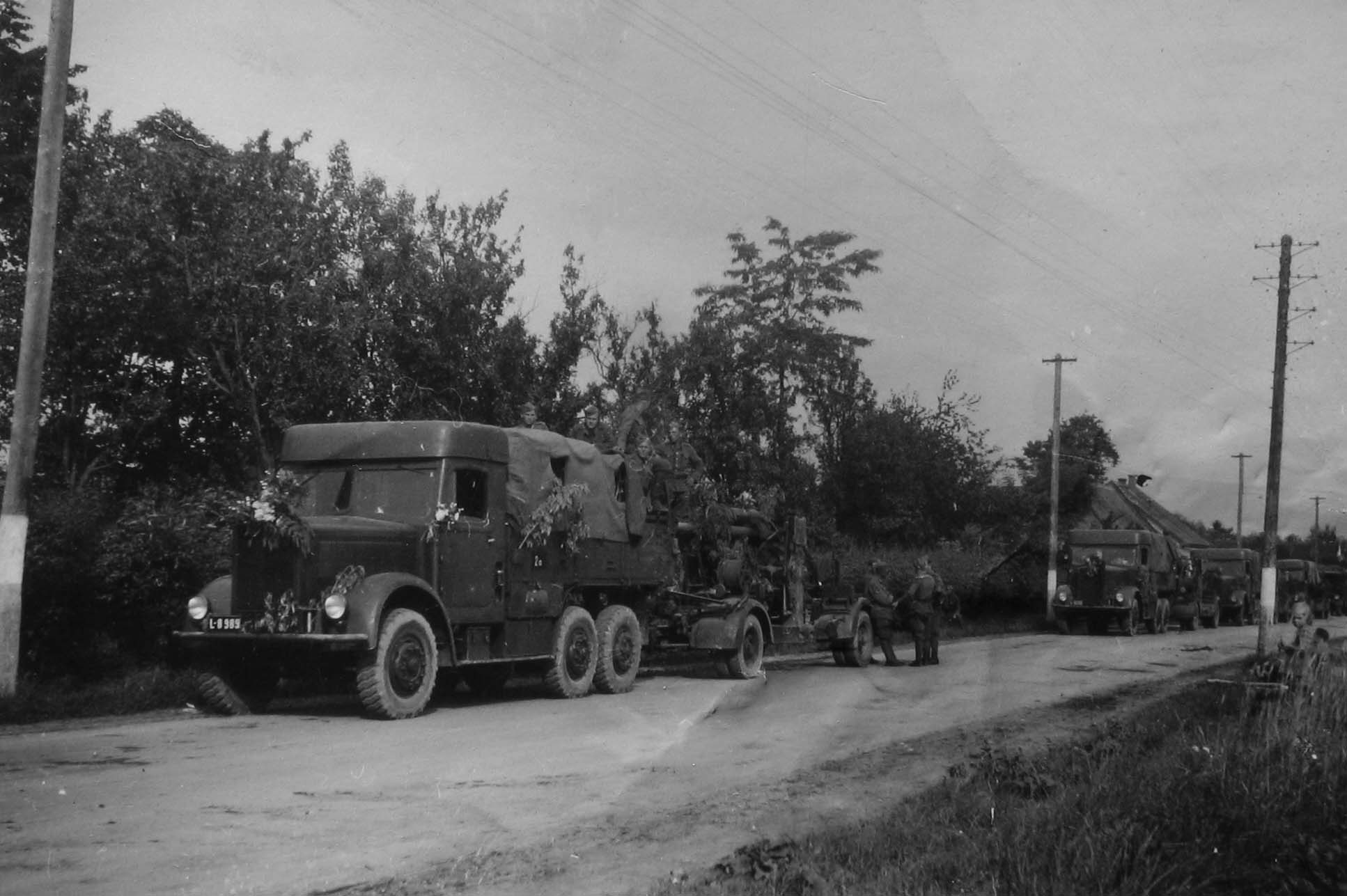

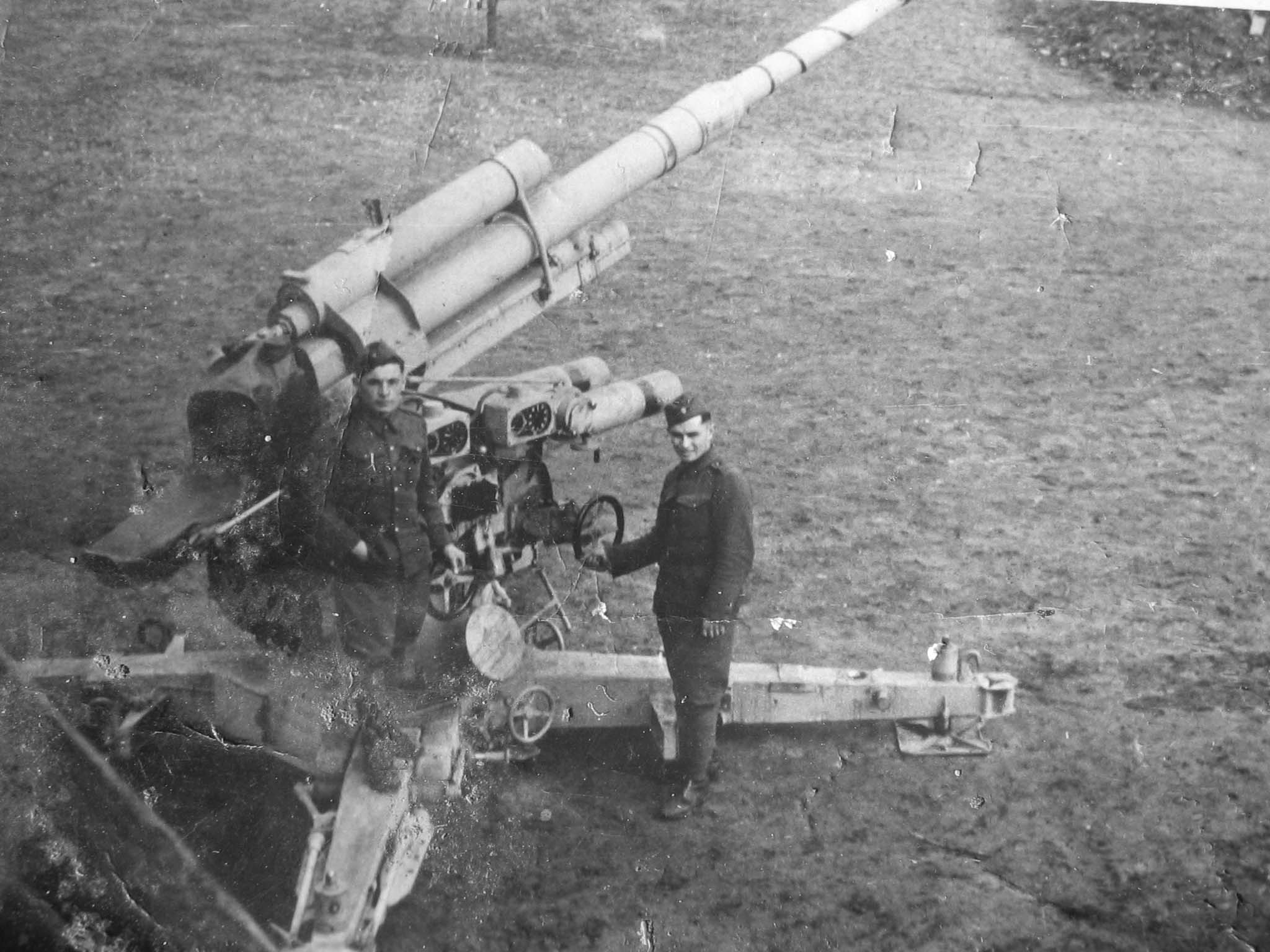
Soldiers of the Slovak insurgent army with war equipment and military vehicles

However, the Slovak National Council and the military headquarters were not aware of the changes in Soviet strategic plans, according to which the Red Army was not to advance from the north across the Carpathians into the middle Danube basin, but from the south through Romania and the Danube valley. Thus, while in Soviet war planning the liberation of Slovakia was postponed to the last months of the war, the leadership of the Slovak Insurgent Army assumed that the Soviet invasion would take place in the summer or early autumn of 1944. Only on the occasion of the political and military changes in Slovakia did the Red Army correct its operational planning. Although it continued its successful campaign in Romania and on the Balkan Peninsula, it opened its offensive on the Beskid front earlier than intended. However, the attack organised at short notice came at the expense of military strength. The Red Army's Eastern Carpathian Operation lasted from 8 September to 28 October 1944, and although the Red Army was only 40 km from the Slovak border when the military action began, by the end of October 1944 it had only managed to conquer Carpathian Ukraine and parts of eastern Slovakia, suffering casualties of 21,000 soldiers killed and 89,000 wounded in the process.

Despite initial successes, the balance of the German "cleansing action" was quite meagre in the first ten days. The responsibility for this lay primarily with SS-Obergruppenführer Berger, who had completely misjudged the dimension of the Slovak uprising and had therefore tried to solve the problem with an insufficient deployment of forces. However, the German general's unconceptualised combat leadership in Slovakia also contributed to the poor result. The German attack had almost come to a standstill after two weeks as a result of the stabilising Slovak defensive front.

As the scope of the insurgents' territory shrank, warfare by partisans became more important. According to the military's plan, the partisan units were to provide effective support for the insurgents and the army, notably by operating in the enemy's rear. Some Slovak partisan groups had even placed themselves under army command before the outbreak of the uprising. Most partisan groups, however, limited the support they gave to the army to the absolute minimum and pursued their own actions, following orders from the Ukrainian Partisan Headquarters in Kiev. Since the Slovak communists failed to gain control of the military, headed by non-Marxist officers, they tried to compensate that by forming their own army from the partisan detachments. The conflict between the army and the partisans led to a crisis during the uprising, which the Slovak National Council tried to resolve on 12 September by setting up a "war council" to coordinate all the activities of the army and the partisans. However, the council, which included leading democrats and communists, was never able to completely resolve the conflict because of constant communist harassment.

=== Reorganisation and territorial gains of the German troops ===
In the second phase of operations, which was characterised by successful defensive battles by the resistance units, Gottlob Berger's units made little progress in the period from 8 to 19 September. In the east of the insurgency area, Army Group North Ukraine limited itself to a minimal defence of the front line, as the Kampfgruppen Mathias and Rintelen were urgently needed to repel the Soviet offensive. Only in the southwest did Kampfgruppe Schill succeed in pushing the front to the east.

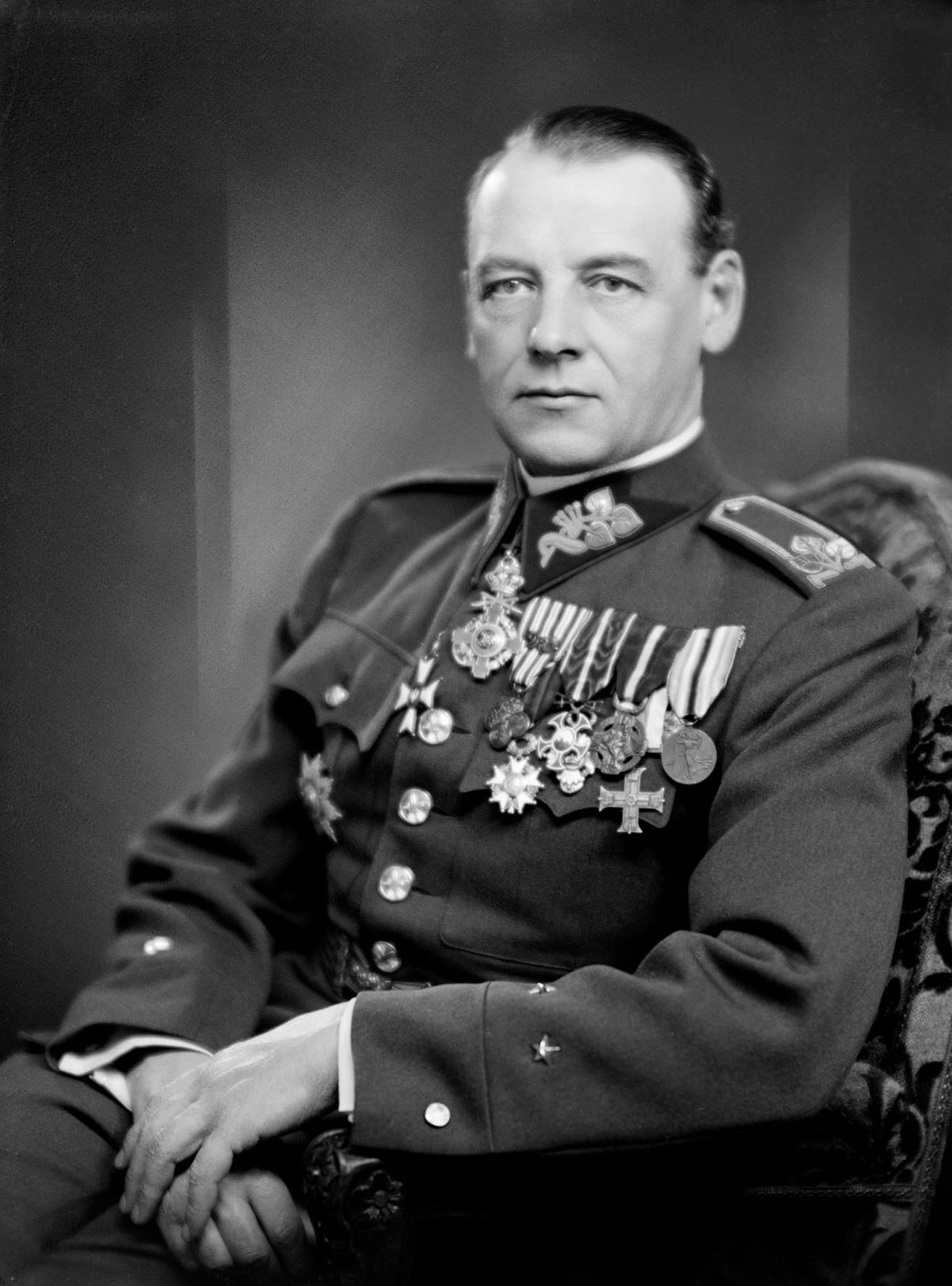
General Rudolf Viest, Second commander-in-chief of the insurgent army

On 14 September, SS-Obergruppenführer Berger was relieved of the post of "German General in Slovakia" by General of the Waffen-SS Hermann Höfle due to his lack of success. With Höfle, a new stage of combat leadership began. After Berger had carried out the armed actions against the insurgents in an essentially improvised and hardly coordinated manner, Höfle had an operational plan drawn up for the first time, which gave priority to a coordinated deployment of all German forces. After three weeks of fighting against the liberation movement, the general intended to seal off the insurgent area with a complete encirclement ring and to proceed concentrically against the resisters. The Tatra Division, which had in the meantime been reinforced by two battalions, now had sufficient fighting power to break through the Slovak defensive barricade near Žilina and capture Martin on 21 September.

Instead of taking advantage of the Tatra Division's attack momentum, Höfle halted the unit to comb the hinterland of the Váh and Turz valleys for partisans. Since the partisans retreated into the impassable Little Tatra, this action was quite unsuccessful. With his "cleansing action" Höfle gave the Slovak insurgent army ten days to build up a new defensive front. Only the II Battalion of Kampfgruppe Schill succeeded in occupying the town of Handlová almost without a fight on 23 September. In the southern section, the operation only began to move again after three weeks, after the I Battalion Schill had taken Žarnovica and on 28 September was able to establish contact with the reinforced battalion of the 14th Waffen-Grenadier Division of the SS, which had only just arrive on that day and then began advancing from the direction of Nová Baňa. In contrast, the weak securing forces of Korück 531 east of Telgárt suffered further setbacks when they once again failed to withstand the onslaught of the insurgents and therefore fell back almost 15 km west of Spišská Nová Ves.

Between 20 September and the beginning of October, the occupier was able to improve his military position considerably, whereby the changed operational command with changing attacking force had proven its worth. By the end of September, the tactical triangle Zvolen-Brezno-Banská Bystrica, the centre of the Slovak insurgency, was within range of the German offensive forces and the insurgents' territory had been reduced to 6,800 km² with a population of 340,000. In view of the successful actions during the last days of September, Höfle planned a frontal attack on the core of the liberation movement, which was only 25 km away from the German lines. The general ordered the Tatra Division in the direction of Kremnica (German: Kremnitz) and Kampfgruppe Schill in the direction of Svätý Kríž to start the offensive. However, he weakened the division by withdrawing part of the forces to Kampfgruppe Schäfer. The reinforced SS unit was ordered to advance from the north towards Liptovská Osada. With his intention to attack Banská Bystrica from three sides, Höfle believed he could defeat the insurgents in a short time. But the operation failed completely, as the individual battle groups were too weak to overcome the massive Slovak defences. Although the Tatra Division occupied Kremnica on 6 October, the offensive as a whole remained a failure, so that the general called off the enterprise on 8 October. Once again, the insurgents had succeeded in resisting the German onslaught.

=== German Final Offensive and End of the Uprising ===
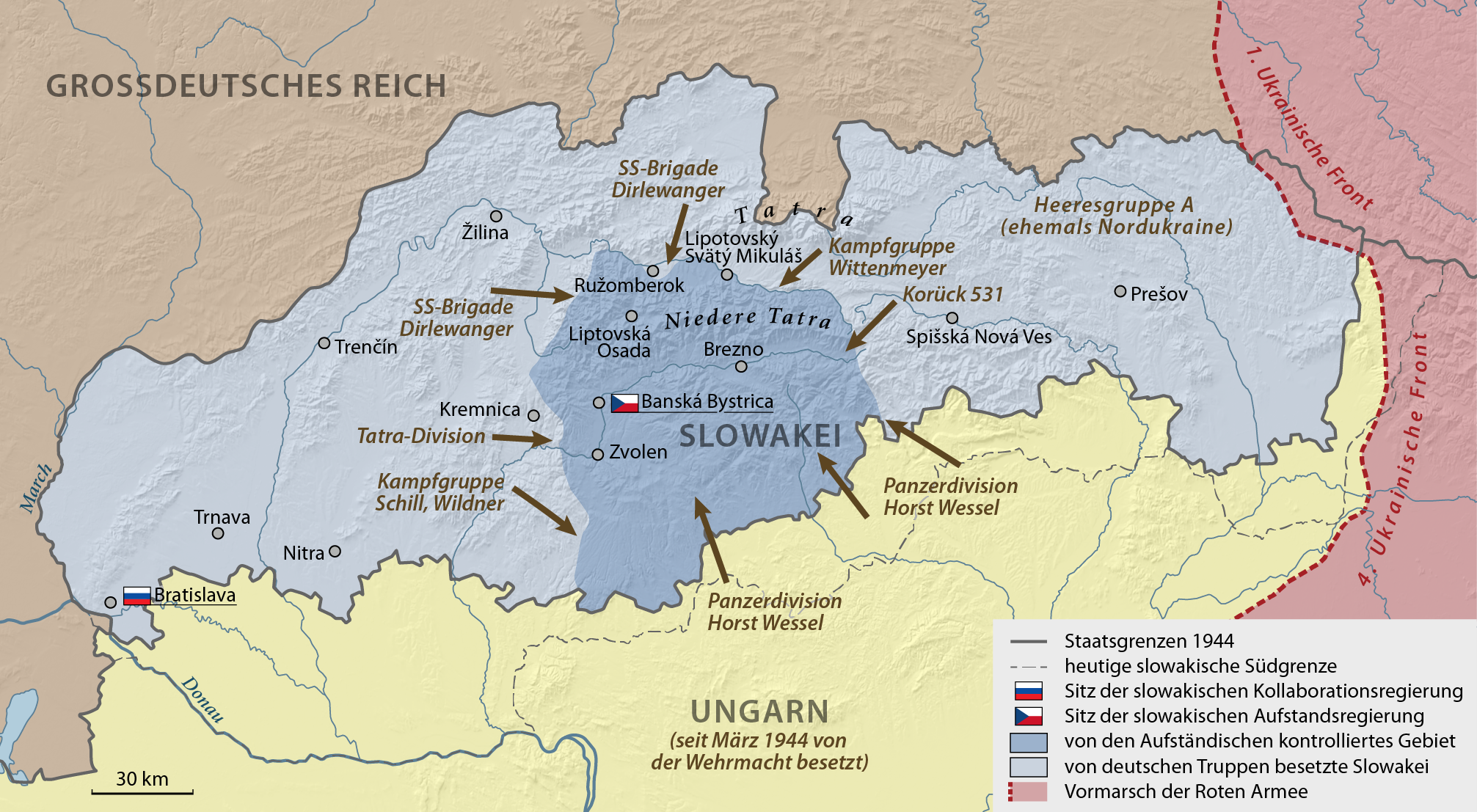
Situation at the beginning of the German final offensive on 18 October 1944

Meanwhile, there had also been a change of leadership among the insurgents. On 7 October, after 40 days, Brigadier General Golian handed over command of the "1st Czechoslovak Army in Slovakia" to Division General Rudolf Viest, who had flown in from London, and became his deputy. Under pressure from the German occupation forces, the insurgents' territory had shrunk to just under 7,000 km² with a population of about 300,000 by the first days of October. The Slovak insurgent army had suffered heavy losses. Some 2,180 soldiers had fallen, thousands more had dropped out through wounding, capture or defection to the enemy. By mid-October, the insurgent army still numbered about 36,000 soldiers, but only two-thirds of them were fully armed and ready for action. In addition, there were a few thousand partisans in the encirclement and the partisans and soldiers outside the encirclement ring behind the German lines, but they had hardly any military effectiveness left. Almost 80% of the armoured weapons had been destroyed by the Germans, and the Slovak artillery had also lost well over half of its stock.

In the period from 10 to 17 October, fighting on all fronts in central Slovakia levelled off. The Germans consolidated in the conquered areas and secured their rule and occupation troops. At the same time, General Höfle drafted an operational plan for the final offensive. Since it had become apparent that the existing formations were not sufficient to defeat the insurgents in the mountainous and easily defensible terrain, the attack forces had to be considerably reinforced. After the fall of the Horthy regime in Budapest and the installation of the Arrow Cross government on 16 October, the Germans were able to smuggle a considerable amount of military material and troops from Hungary into southern Slovakia. From this point on, the insurgents' situation deteriorated visibly. Two new battle groups were to contribute to the final conclusion. On 16 October, the notorious SS-Sonderregiment Dirlewanger, which had already been used in the suppression of the Warsaw Uprising, arrived in the north of the area of operations with 15,000 men. In the southeast, the 18th Panzer Grenadier Division of the SS "Horst Wessel" gathered on Hungarian territory. The operational plan encompassed that the German units would attack concentrically from all sides, with the SS 18th Panzer Grenadier Division intervening in the fighting from the neighbouring country as a surprise element. In this way, Höfle intended to leave the enemy with no means of evasion.

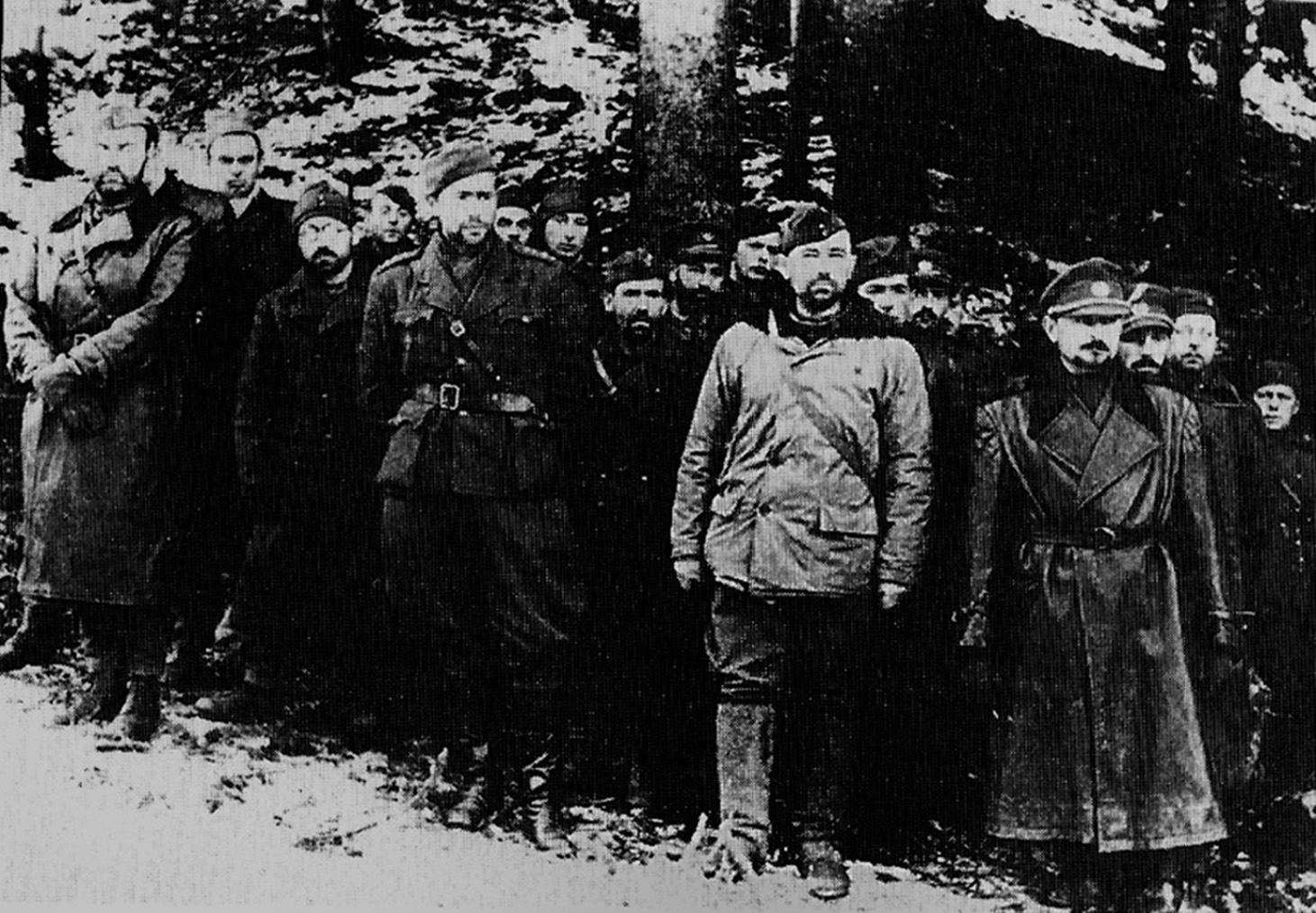
Soldiers of the insurgent army retreating into the mountains after the suppression of the uprising

After the deployment had essentially been completed on 17 October, the attack was scheduled to begin the following day. On 18 October, the Kampfgruppe Schill and the SS-Sonderregiment Dirlewanger opened the final offensive, with the Tatra Division merely tying up the enemy in its combat strip. It was not even a day later that the operation in the south began with the 18th SS Division as well as Kampfgruppe Wittenmeier, which was composed of parts of the 14th SS Division and a reinforced army battalion. The security forces of Korück 531, which had assumed command in the Eastern Slovakia command area on 10 October, also intervened in the final offensive from the Betlanovce-Spišská Nova Ves area from 19 October onwards and were able to bring the area up to the western border of the operational area under German control within six days. The units in the south proceeded according to plan against the centre of insurgency in Banská Bystrica, which was captured by Kampfgruppe Schill on 27 October. (Note: Klaus Schönherr erroneously names 28 October as the day on which Banská Bystrica fell. However, the centre of the uprising had already fallen the day before.) With the capture of Banská Bystrica, the uprising against the "protective power" and the Tiso regime collapsed.

Although the uprising was put down, the army did not capitulate. On the night of 28 October, at 4 a.m., General Rudolf Viest issued his last order to the "1st Czechoslovak Army in Slovakia". In it, he accepted the defeat of the insurgent army as an organised unit and ordered the soldiers to cease regular resistance, retreat to the mountains and switch to partisan fighting.

=== Role of the Slovak collaboration regime ===
The Slovak government in Bratislava was unpleasantly surprised by the proclamation of the Slovak National Uprising and shocked by the spontaneous reaction of the population. Before their eyes, the entire power apparatus broke down and the continued existence of the Slovak state was only possible under German supervision and with the assistance of National Socialist power structures. On 5 September 1944, a week after the outbreak of the uprising, a new government was installed in Slovakia. Štefan Tiso, a third cousin of President Jozef Tiso, replaced the previous Prime Minister Vojtech Tuka and at the same time took over the Ministry of Foreign Affairs as well as the Ministry of Justice. Besides the government, President Jozef Tiso was one of the most important agents in Slovakia. In addition to his far-reaching powers enshrined in the 1939 constitution, Tiso enjoyed great popularity and authority among the population, which was based on the well-regarded intermingling of state and church offices. Externally, Tiso knew how to underpin the independence of the Slovak state by performing representative tasks. This position led to the Germans sticking with him even after the outbreak of the uprising, although he was at no time one of the radical representatives of National Socialist ideology among Slovak politicians.

Symbol of the paramilitary Hlinka Guard, which supported the German occupying forces with Emergency Divisions (POHG).

The Slovak government remained loyal to its "protecting power" until the end of the war. However, the Slovak army proved completely useless to the German troops moving into Slovakia in late summer 1944. Even though the Slovak regime was firmly behind the German commander, it could hardly support him with its own fighting troops. Two divisions of the Slovak army were deployed outside Slovakia in 1944; two others stationed in eastern Slovakia were disarmed and seized by the Germans immediately after the outbreak of the uprising. In western and especially central Slovakia, a large number of Slovak officers and soldiers joined the uprising. The Slovak army had disintegrated, and by the end of the war the Slovak regime had not succeeded in replacing it with a newly formed army. The result of these efforts was the "Domobrana" (Engl. Home defense), which was able to draw on an "army" of 6,900 soldiers loyal to the government in mid-September 1944, rising to just under 20,000 men in November and reaching a personnel strength of 41,000 soldiers through the mobilisation of older cohorts in January and March 1945. The core was formed by the garrisons that had remained loyal to the regime, first and foremost the Nitra garrison, which was the only one not to be disarmed after the outbreak of the uprising. However, the "Domobrana" had more of a symbolic character, since the army's lack of combat readiness, inadequate training and equipment (more than two-thirds of its men remained unarmed) ruled out from the outset any deployment at the front or in the fight against the partisans, so that it could be called upon primarily only for entrenchment and repair work in the hinterland.

Since the Slovak army and the Slovak police had failed, to act efficiently after the outbreak of the uprising, the Hlinka Guard remained the only organisation on whose cooperation the Tiso regime or the German authorities were willing to rely. Immediately after his appointment as the new head of the Hlinka Guard on 7 September 1944, Otomar Kubala began to reorganise the Guard. The most important change of all was the establishment of the Hlinka Guard Emergency Divisions (Slovak: Pohotovostné oddiely Hlinkovej gardy, POHG for short); these were special armed units that were set up in larger towns and subordinated to the responsible district captains of the Hlinka Guard or their main commander in Bratislava. A total of 38 POHG units were established; in March 1945, 5,867 Slovaks served in the POHG. The POHG were organised as military units, but – although they were subordinate to the army's judiciary – they were not part of the army organisation. Their field companies (Slovak Poľné roty) wore German uniforms and collaborated directly with the German Sicherheitspolizei and Sicherheitsdienst. Under the Ministry of Defence, a State Secretariat for Security was created, to which all security police organs (state security, police, gendarmerie, but also the Hlinka Guard) were subordinate. Otomar Kubala was also appointed its head as per the instructions of the German commander.

=== Insurgent government and population ===
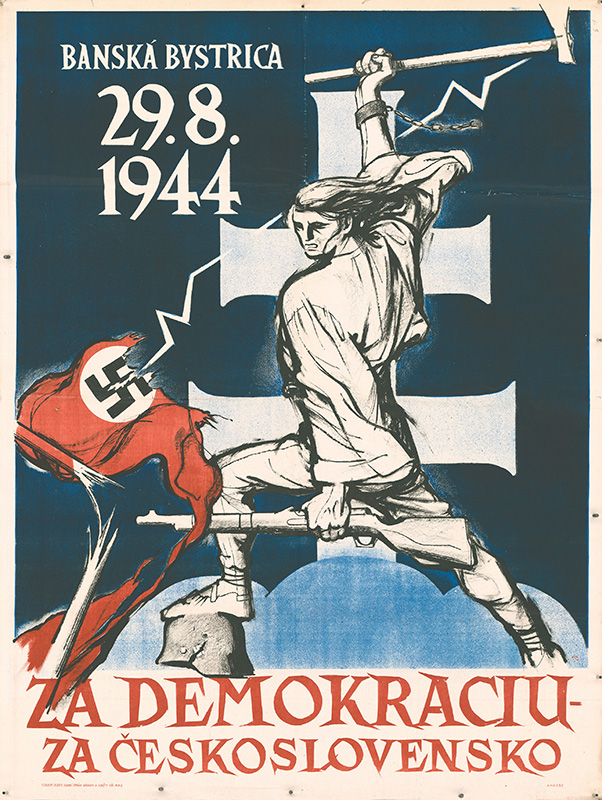
Propaganda poster of the insurgents: 'For Democracy – For Czechoslovakia'

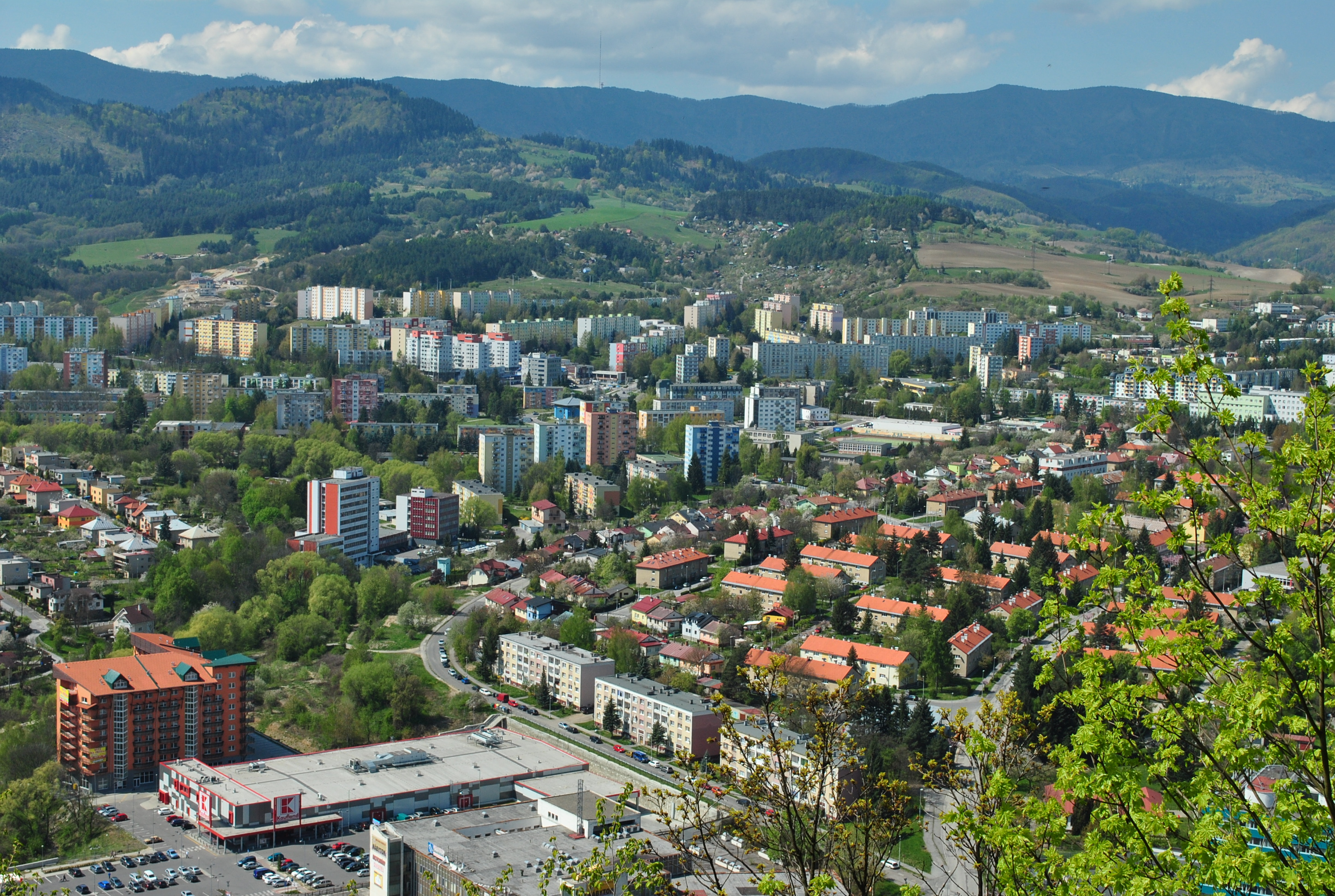
Today's Banská Bystrica and its surroundings

For sixty days Banská Bystrica was the command center of the insurgent army and also the center of political life and administration of the liberated Slovakia. The insurgent Slovakia formed an independent administrative-state entity – the restored Czechoslovak Republic. The revolutionary Slovak National Council, which now had 13 members, was fully established on September 5 after Slovak communist Karol Šmidke returned from Moscow. Together with Vavro Šrobár, the representative of the civic-democratic camp, Šmidke became one of the two chairmen of the Slovak National Council. The National Council and its organs had, in principle, the same number of members from the socialist bloc and the civic-democratic bloc. The plenary assembly of the Slovak National Council (consisting of 41 members from September 5 and 50 members from October) issued decrees with the force of laws. The Slovak National Council assumed legislative, judicative, and executive power in Slovakia and repealed laws and decrees that contradicted the "republican-democratic spirit" (including all anti-Jewish laws). In turn, those Slovak, German, and Hungarian parties and organizations that shaped the political system of the Slovak state were banned.

In terms of party politics, the civic-democratic camp of the insurgents organized itself into the Democratic Party (DS), while the socialist block, in turn, organized itself into the Communist Party of Slovakia. In this context, the most radical change with regard to the conditions in the Slovak state, but also in the previous Czechoslovak Republic, was the accession to power of the Slovak Communists, who until 1938 never received more than 10 percent of the vote in parliamentary elections. The uprising did not represent a "communist coup", as the representatives of the civic camp were the more significant component in the preparation and course of the uprising. Nevertheless, it was during the uprising that the Slovak communists first came to power, became the ruling party, and assumed key political positions. The new political system established through the Slovak National Council was independent of the Ludak government in Bratislava, as well as the exile centres in London and Moscow. Its political system was more democratic than that of the Ludaks, but political parties other than the Democrats and the Communists were not allowed. Also, all educational institutions of the national minorities were closed, with the exception of elementary (primary) schools.

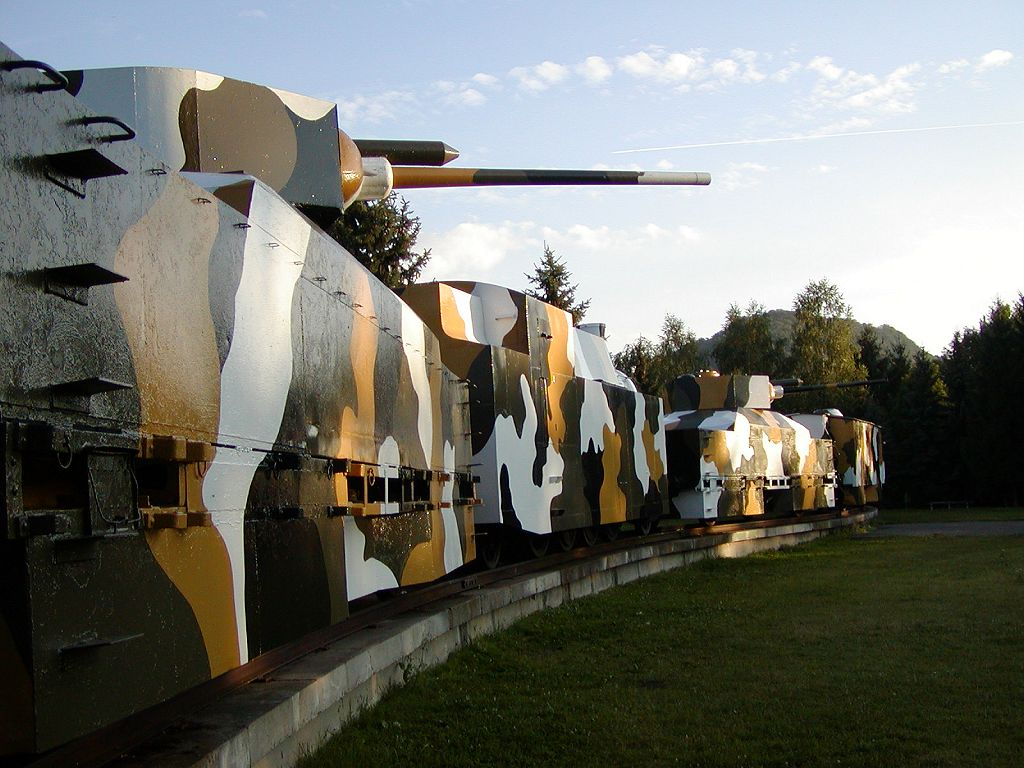
Replica of an armoured Zvolen train

The economy of the area controlled by the insurgents was primarily subordinated to military requirements. A key enterprise was Podbrezovské železiarne (= Podbrezov Iron Works), which produced mainly grenade launchers, steel anti-tank obstacles, etc. for the insurgents without interruption for two months. The production of the ironworks in Podbrezov was also important. Also integral were the railroad works in Zvolen, which managed to build three armoured trains in record time. The financial security of the insurgent area was provided by a branch of the National Bank of Slovakia in Banská Bystrica; the rest of the economic-social life was under the responsibility of the individual commissioners (ministers) of the Slovak National Council. In addition to the requirements of the army, it was also necessary to serve the civilian sector. In terms of infrastructure, roads were crucial here, with railroad lines also being used for the civilian sector. Regarding supplies, a system of food stamps was applied in the insurgency area, as it was in the Slovak state.

The issue of information, or in a broader sense propaganda, was also important. The most important role here was played primarily by the insurrectionary radio, which began its activities on August 30, 1944, as Slobodný slovenský vysielač (= Free Slovak Radio) in Banská Bystrica and served as a means of mobilization, organization and information for the population of central Slovakia. During the uprising, BBC also broadcast in Czech and Slovak for Czechoslovakia and Moscow Radio, organized by the Moscow leadership of the Communist Party of Czechoslovakia. In addition, 20 to 30 newspapers and magazines appeared more or less regularly in the insurgency area, and institutions like theatres and cinemas were also up and running, which can be seen as an indicator for times of peace.

From both sides, the resistance struggle was repeatedly understood not only as political, but also as a confessional struggle of "the Lutherans against the Catholics." During the existence of the Slovak state, the majority of Catholic dignitaries took a loyal stance towards the new regime, and several also worked in its highest political and legislative structures. After the outbreak of the uprising, Catholic parish priests within the uprising area were labelled as enemies of the renewed Czechoslovak Republic and were persecuted, some even executed. The situation was diametrically different for the Protestant Church, which did not identify with the Ludak regime and adopted a negative attitude towards it. During the preparation and creation of the political resistance organization, it was thus Protestants who took over its leading positions, while practicing Catholics were practically non-existent in the Slovak National Council. Later, dozens of Protestant pastors as well as bishops joined the uprising – which included the mostly Protestant areas of Turiec, Liptov and Banská Bystrica. Almost all of the Protestant pastors were active in the field mission of the 1st Czechoslovak Army in Slovakia during the uprising. Nevertheless, to speak of an "evangelical uprising" would be incorrect, since the majority of the members of the insurgent army – that is, the decisive force of the uprising – were Catholics.

=== Conduct of the Allies ===
The successful implementation of the uprising was based on the assumption that it would be quickly and effectively supported by the Allies. However, the Allies took an ambivalent attitude toward the Slovak popular uprising. The Western Allies sympathized with the uprising politically, but took little interest in it militarily, since their armies were not planning to conduct operations in east-central Europe. Contrarily, Soviets were interested in the uprising from the military point of view, since it could facilitate the advance of the Soviet army to the west. Politically, however, they viewed the uprising with suspicion because its leading class was composed of communists and democrats; the democrats being hostile "bourgeois nationalists" from a Marxist point of view. Wolfgang Venohr assessed Allied support for the Slovak National Uprising in summary as "just as insignificant and insufficient as in the case of the Warsaw Uprising."

On August 31, 1944, Jan Masaryk, foreign minister of the Czechoslovak government-in-exile, personally addressed the Allied representatives in London and asked them to support the Slovak insurgents. He requested the representatives of Great Britain and the United States that the Allies bomb the German operational targets in Slovakia, and secondly, that Allies issue a declaration granting the domestic Czechoslovak forces the rights of combatants so that the insurgents would be under the protection of the Geneva Convention. On September 7, the U.S. State Department issued a statement conceding to the Slovak insurgents "to constitute forces fighting against the Germans" and strongly warned the Germans not to violate "the rules of war" in the form of reprisals against them. The British Foreign Office issued a similar statement.

The British and American commands were reluctant to accede to Masaryk's request for military assistance to the Slovaks. British and American air forces had already bombed certain targets in Slovakia and had provided aid to the Warsaw Uprising, which was farther away from their base in Italy than Slovakia. They also landed twice at Banská Bystrica to evacuate Allied pilots who had taken shelter over the area the Germans occupied. Nevertheless, on September 22, the American General Staff decided to refrain from supporting the Slovaks on the grounds that "it would not constitute a reasonably feasible operation for the American and British air forces." American reluctance to support the Slovak uprising was due to the oft-expressed fear of the Chairman of the U.S. Joint Chiefs of Staff – namely that Western interference in Eastern Europe might jeopardize the support promised by the Soviets in the Pacific.

The Soviet government never responded to Britain's request, although it did provide limited aid to the Slovak insurgents. On September 22, the Soviet government, somewhat belatedly, appended to the declarations of the United States and Great Britain a declaration of its own which conceded "to the united resistance forces on Czechoslovak territory the right of a belligerent state with all the consequences which flow therefrom." Earlier, the Soviet command issued an order to the 1st Czechoslovak Army Corps, which was conducting joint operations with the 4th Ukrainian Front and Soviet forces, to attempt a breakthrough through the Dukla Pass in the Carpathians and establish links with the Slovak insurgents. However, when the Czechoslovak army reached the pass on September 14, it was no longer guarded by the Slovak army but by the Germans. The Czechoslovak and Soviet forces were able to take it on October 6 only after suffering heavy losses.

In direct support of the Slovak uprising, the Soviet command sent the 1st Czechoslovak Air Squadron with 21 fighter planes, which was a valuable aid. The Soviet Command also sent the 2nd Czechoslovak Parachute Brigade, which included about 2,000 well-trained and well-equipped men. However, they arrived only gradually over the course of several weeks. As a result, they could not participate in combat as a unit. The Soviets also transferred several smaller weapons and 150 antitank guns, but they were ineffective against the Germans' heavy and medium tanks.

=== Military strategic significance of the uprising ===
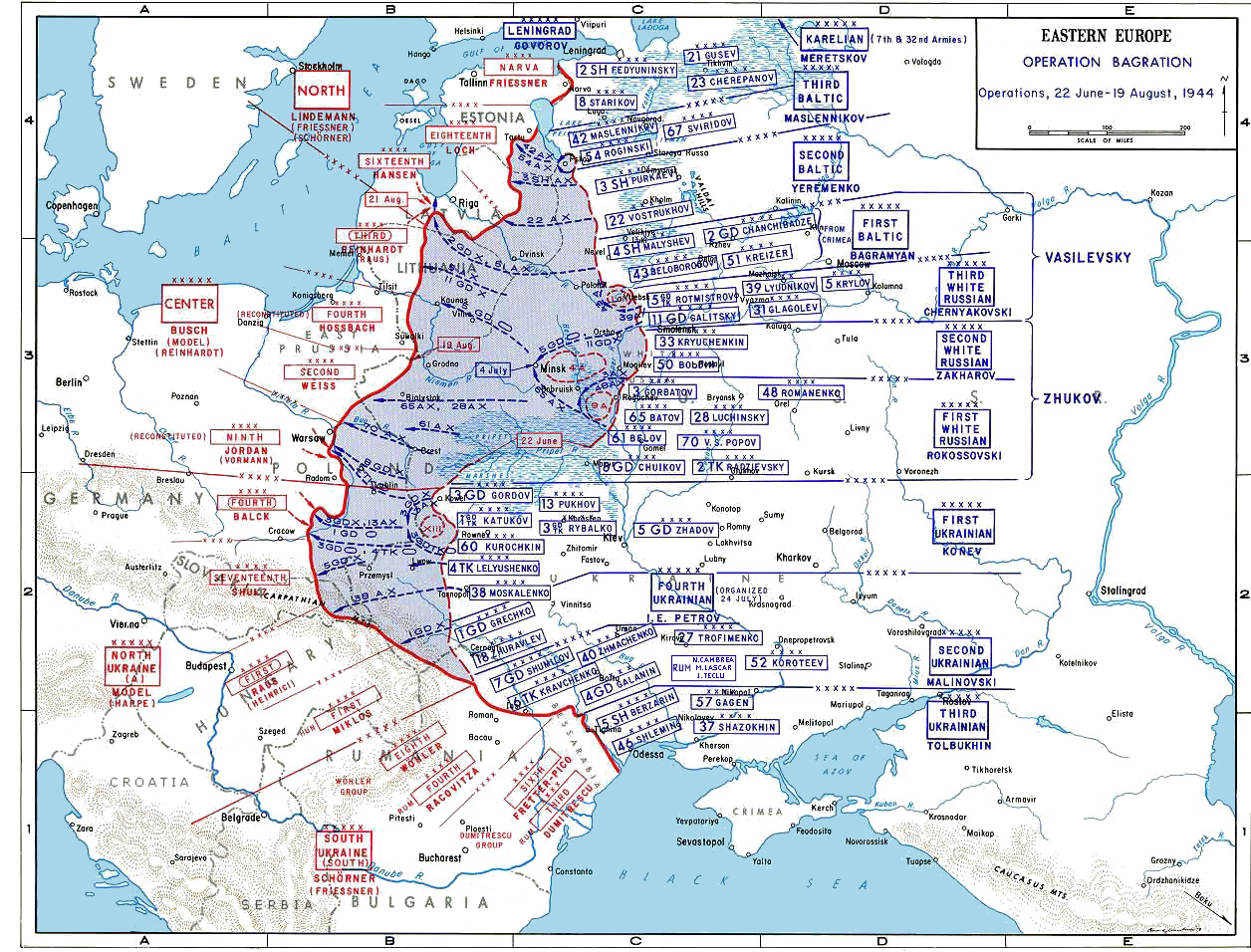
Territorial gains by the Soviets until 19 August 1944

When the Slovak National Uprising began on August 29, 1944, the event threatened not only the Slovak collaborationist regime under Tiso, but also the hegemony of Nazi Germany in East Central Europe. At the same time, the possibility could not be ruled out that the uprising would expand into a threat to the German defensive front between the Vistula and the Southern Carpathians. By the summer of 1944, the Axis powers had completely lost the military initiative on the Eastern Front and had been forced onto the defensive by the Red Army. In the process, the Wehrmacht had lost so much substance by the summer of 1944 that it was barely able to maintain front-line cohesion. At this stage of the war, two factors in particular affected the Axis forces' ability to act operationally. On the one hand, the Anglo-American Allied invasion of northern France on June 6 had created a new focal point in the west of the German dominion, and on the other hand, the Soviet summer offensive, which opened in mid-June in the front section of Army Group Centre, worsened the military situation of the Third Reich so much so that the Wehrmacht was even more at the mercy of the superior forces of the anti-Hitler coalition than it had been before.

Therefore, German historian Klaus Schönherr states that although at first glance the Slovak National Uprising gives the appearance that the event was an isolated occurrence in the rear of the German front, upon closer examination it nevertheless proved to be a factor that significantly influenced the military situation as well as operational procedures on the southern wing of the Eastern Front. This was because the politico-military events in Slovakia caused the USSR military leadership to significantly change its operational intentions and adapt them to the new circumstances. The Red Army wanted to use the national military resistance to collapse the cornerstone of the German front. Thus, Moscow intended to occupy Hungary as well as to advance directly into the southern parts of the "Greater German Reich". As a result of the Red Army's revised operational planning, the Wehrmacht was forced not only to repel the Soviet-Romanian offensive in Transylvania, but also to resume full-scale defence in the Beskids after a brief period of rest. Ultimately, the Wehrmacht, as well as its Hungarian ally, still possessed the substance to both put down the uprising in central Slovakia and to repel the Soviet objective of encircling and destroying parts of Army Group A and South.

From a military point of view, the significance of the uprising was primarily that it disrupted the cohesive, unified German front. From the outbreak of the uprising until the end of the war, Slovakia ceased to be a safe rear area for the German Army on the Eastern Front. Behind the lines of the front, the communication system of the Germans was interrupted. Slovakia no longer formed a convenient supply route or a retreat area for the German forces. The German troops, which were urgently needed elsewhere to fight the Allies, were kept in Slovakia to fight the insurgents and the partisans. The German plans about using the Slovak army in the war was foiled. In the end, the Germans suffered heavy losses of life and material in fighting the insurgents and the partisans. Nevertheless, the military significance of the uprising remained low in the end. Only for the disarmament of the two Slovak divisions in eastern Slovakia did the Wehrmacht withdraw units from other fronts. Otherwise, reserve and replacement units that were in the process of being deployed or re-deployed after a front-line mission were primarily used for counterinsurgency operations.

=== The German ethnic group and war crimes of the insurgents ===
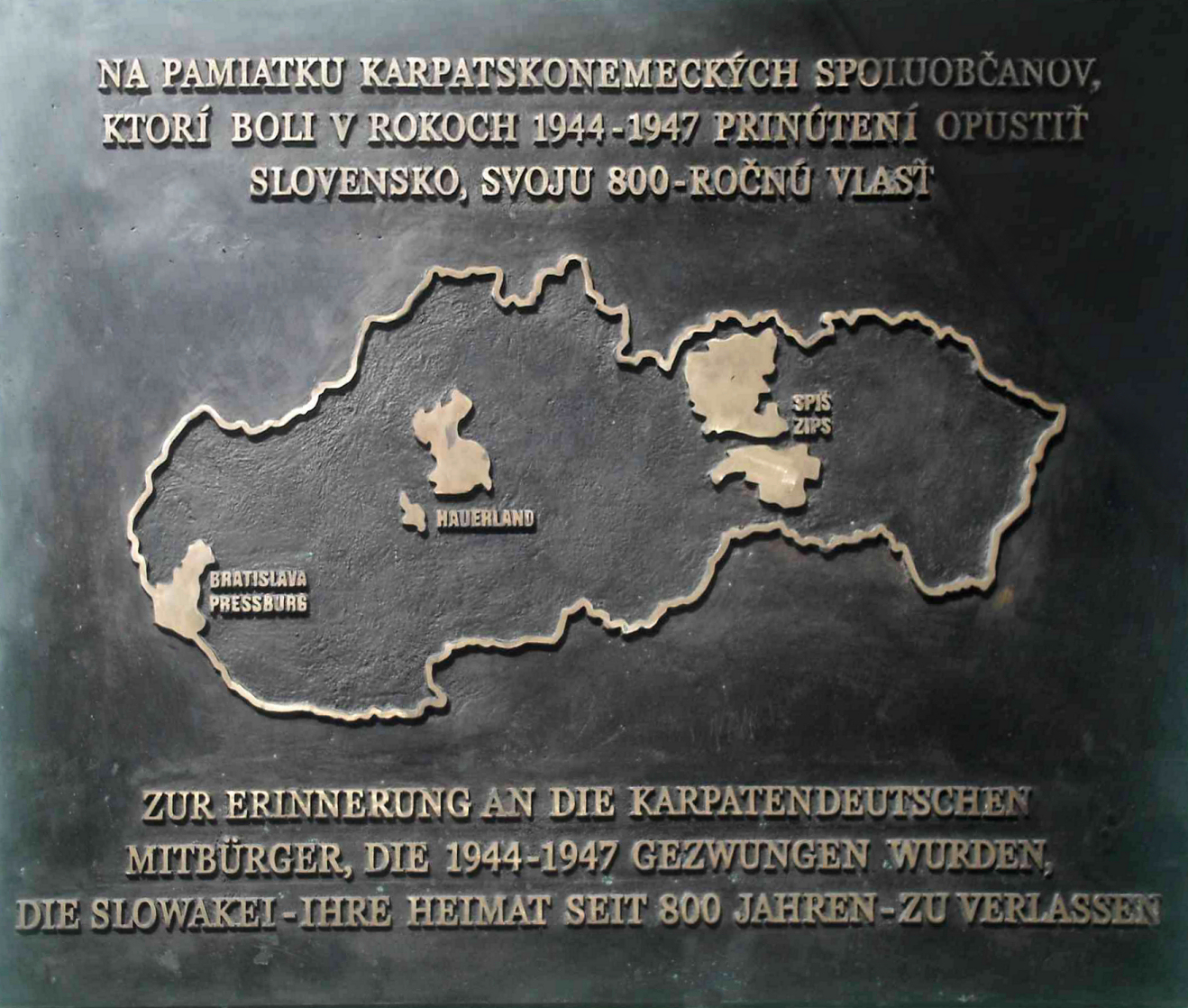
Depiction of German settlement areas in Slovakia on a memorial plaque for Expellees

According to the results of the census conducted in December 1940, there were 130,192 Slovak citizens living in Slovakia who professed German nationality (Carpathian Germans). Their ancestors had migrated to the then Kingdom of Hungary as early as in the 12th century and lived mostly in the following three settlement areas since the 19th century: in Bratislava (before 1918 Pressburg/Pozsony) and its surroundings in Western Slovakia, in the Hauerland in Central Slovakia and in the Spiš region in Eastern Slovakia. After the formation of the Slovak state, they were granted extensive rights as a national minority according to the Slovak constitution.

The Germans became politically active in the Slovak state primarily through the German Party (DP), formed in 1938. At its head was Franz Karmasin, who at the same time was appointed State Secretary of the newly established State Secretariat for German Ethnic Group Affairs. Specifically, the DP had the task of educating the Germans included in the party politically and militarily along the lines of the Reich German NSDAP, promoting the economic and cultural life of the Germans living in Slovakia, and ensuring that they were treated as fully equal citizens and enjoyed the same rights as Slovaks. In the fall of 1941, the DP had 60,997 members, encompassing almost half of the Slovak citizens of German nationality. The military organization of the Germans was the Freiwillige Schutzstaffel (FS), which in mid-1944 had a total of 7,818 members and was mostly assigned guard duties, but often also participated in various "security measures", e.g., the arrests of Jews. On September 2, 1944, by order of the German commander in Slovakia, the Deutsche Heimatschutz was established. All members of the German ethnic group from 16 to 50 years of age who were fit for military service were to be registered by the SS-Einsatzkommando Slowakei and initially deployed in closed settlement areas as local armed forces. According to a list from January 1945, the Deutsche Heimatschutz had a total of 8,116 members.

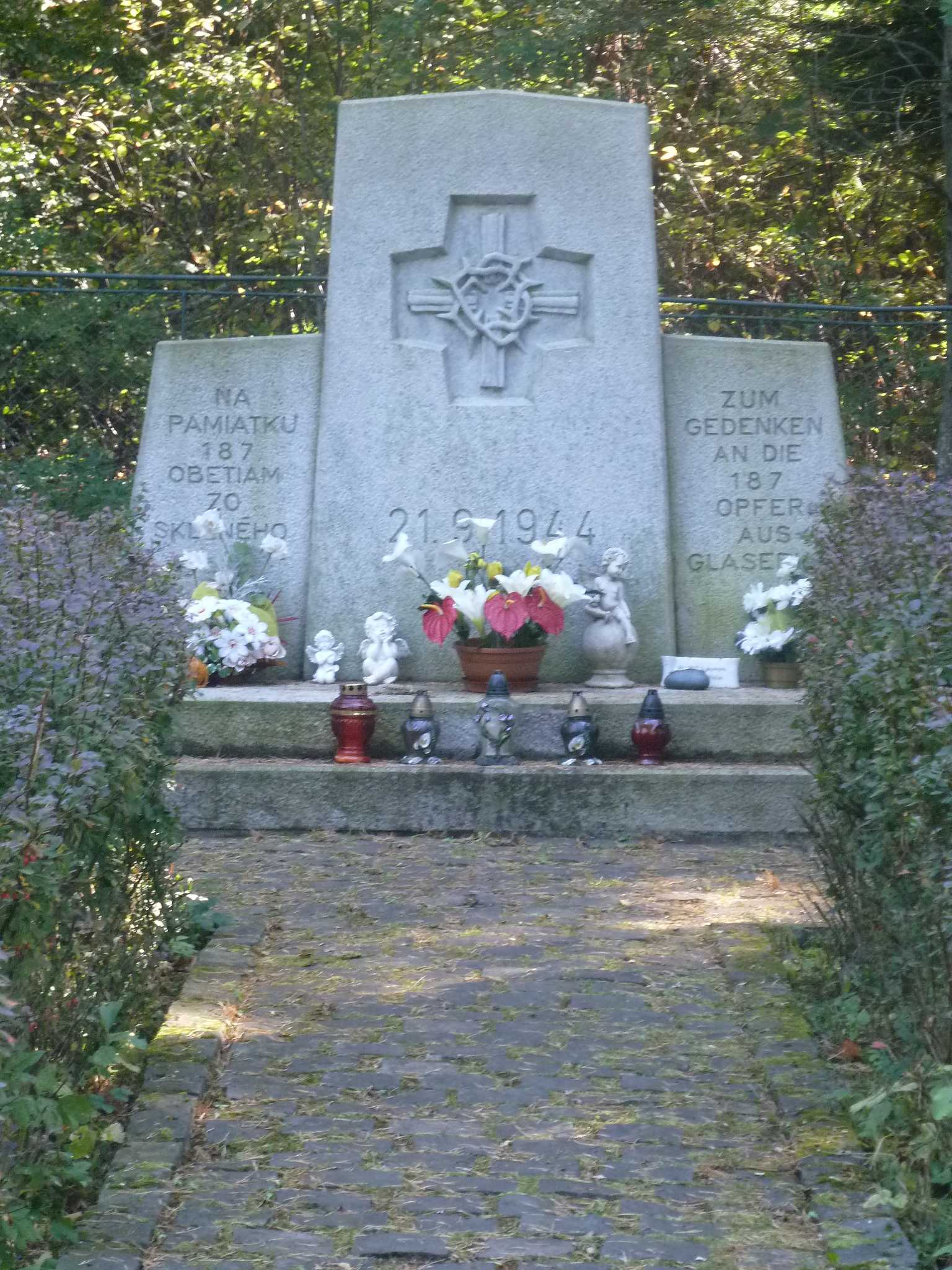
Mass grave and memorial in Sklené (German: Glaserhau)

Numerous crimes against the German minority occurred in the liberated territory controlled by insurgents. The number of ethnic Germans killed in Slovakia cannot be accurately determined to this day. It is assumed that partisans and insurgents murdered between 1,000 and 1,500 people in their actions against the civilian population, the vast majority of whom were of German nationality. Most of the crimes against ethnic Germans were committed shortly after the outbreak of the uprising in central Slovakia, in the Hauerland region. In this area, insurgents and partisans exercised control for more than a month, mostly targeting German civilians. An order from the illegal military headquarters dated August 28, 1944, stated that after the insurrection was declared, all local Germans along with their families were to be immediately interned in barracks or liquidated if they resisted. In several places in central Slovakia, ethnic Germans (Volksdeutsche) were murdered in the late summer of 1944, partly because they were committed to the interests of the Reich, but also simply because they belonged to the German minority.

The largest mass shooting took place on September 21 near the village of Sklené (German: Glaserhau). On the night of September 17, the village, where almost 90 percent of the population professed German nationality, was occupied by about 250 partisans of the unit "1st Czechoslovak Partisan Brigade of Josef W. Stalin." (Note: Šindelářová incorrectly calls the unit 'Lenin', in fact it was the 9th unit of Josef W. Stalin's 1st Czechoslovak Partisan Brigade operating in the neighbourhood.) On the night of September 21, these conducted house searches and had about 300 men between the ages of 16 and 60 line up at the local school. From there, most of them were taken – under the pretext of doing entrenchment work – This to the train station, where they had to board a train. After a journey of about two kilometres, the train stopped. The prisoners had to get off and were shot by the partisans. A total of 187 men were murdered in this way, and another 62 were taken to the internment camp in Slovenská Ľupča. Further shootings of ethnic Germans by partisans and insurgents took place in Handlová (German: Krickerhau), about 80 murdered and other places in the Hauerland region.

During autumn of 1944, in anticipation of the Red Army's advance, the German leadership began preparing for a total evacuation of Germans from Slovakia. An exact number of the evacuated ethnic Germans has not yet been determined; figures vary between 70,000 and 120,000 evacuees. In total, two-thirds of the ethnic Germans living in Slovakia were probably affected by the evacuation. After the war, some of them returned to Slovakia, but were then expelled from Czechoslovakia again in 1946 as part of the resettlement campaigns along with those who remained. In the census conducted in 1950, only 5,179 inhabitants in Slovakia professed German nationality. In this respect, the Third Reich and the Slovak state, which existed for six years, effectively meant the end of the coexistence of Germans and Slovaks in this region, which had lasted since the Middle Ages.

=== Participation of Jews in the Uprising ===
At the outbreak of the uprising in August 1944, it is estimated that up to 25,000 Jews were still living on Slovak territory. The majority had a work permit from one of the Slovak ministries as essential workers, while Jews baptised before 14 March 1939 (around 3,200) and those living in mixed marriages (around 1,000) mostly had an exceptional permit from the president. However, some also lived in Slovakia unregistered.

Jews fought as soldiers and officers of the insurgent army and as members of the partisan units on all fronts of the uprising. One of the units that took part in the fighting was made up exclusively of Jews, recruited from 250 combat-ready former internees of the Nováky concentration camp. Their partisan unit ('Nováky Group') became part of the 4th Tactical Group of the Uprising Army. The four members of the British military mission in Banská Bystrica who parachuted into the uprising zone occupied a special position among the Jewish fighters who took part in the Slovak uprising. All of them had previously lived in what was then Palestine and had completed parachute courses. Immediately after the outbreak of the uprising, all four volunteered to join the military commission that the British High Command intended to send to Slovakia. The mission's task was to mediate between the British Army Command and the High Command of the insurgent Slovakia. After the German troops had occupied the centre of the uprising, the Palestinian-Jewish paratroopers retreated into the mountains. Three of the four soldiers died as a result of the uprising.

The majority of the Jewish partisans fought in various partisan units – This Jewish names were found in 32 of the 46 larger partisan units. The total number of Jewish participants ascertained to date is 1,566, of which 1,397 were men and 169 women. This means that of the total of around 16,000 partisans, around 10% were Jews, and up to 6.4% of the Jewish population remaining in Slovakia took part in the uprising (due to the previous deportations, the majority of Jews in Slovakia at that time were elderly). This meant that the percentage of Jews who decided in favour of the uprising was higher than the percentage of Slovak fighters in the total population. 269 Jewish partisans fell in battle or died as a result of the fighting, which corresponds to 17% of all Jews who fought. 166 Jewish participants in the uprising were honoured with the Order of the SNP I. and II. Class. This puts the participation of Jews in the anti-fascist struggle in Slovakia at the forefront of Jewish involvement in the European resistance movement, not only in terms of numbers but also in terms of the intensity of their participation.

== Consequences ==
=== German occupation regime and war crimes ===
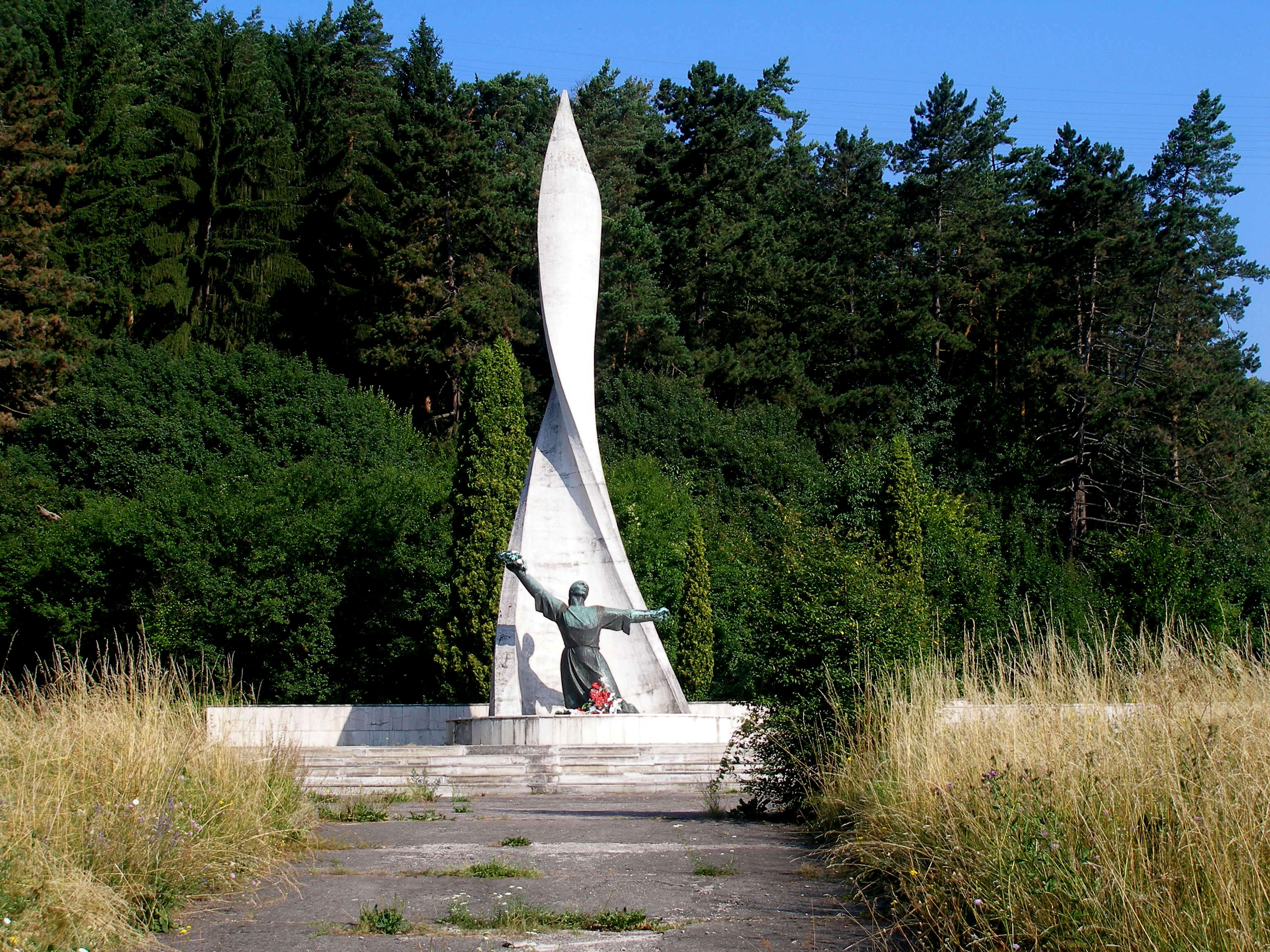
Memorial to those at least 400 people who were murdered by the German Einsatzgruppe H with the assistance of the Hlinka Guard Emergency Divisions (POHG) in Nemecká.

By the start of the uprising at the latest, the Tiso regime had finally lost support in its own country and had become completely dependent on the German Reich. In the period that followed, SS troops, together with Slovak units and the 'Home Guard' recruited from the German population in Slovakia, took brutal action against partisans as well as against civilians. The retaliatory measures against the captured insurgents and 'punitive measures' against the civilian population in the former insurgency areas were faced with caused the number of victims to rise after the end of the uprising. Public executions, mass shootings, deportations to extermination and concentration camps and the burning of communities and villages were now part of everyday life in Slovakia. Most of the actions were organised by Einsatzgruppe H, which was sent to Slovakia shortly after the outbreak of the uprising, and were often carried out with the help of locals. The victims were mainly Jews, but numerous Roma, arrested partisans and insurgents as well as their supporters were not spared. In total, around 30,000 citizens of Slovakia were deported to German prison, labour, internment and concentration camps (about two-thirds to prison and labour camps).

The places with the most mass shootings were Kremnička (743 victims, including 280 women and 99 children) and Nemecká (at least 400 victims), where the shootings were organised by Einsatzkommando 14 of Einsatzgruppe H under Obersturmführer Herbert Deffner and carried out with the cooperation of a troop from the Hlinka Guard Emergency Divisions (POHG). An important task of Einsatzgruppe H was to arrest the military leaders of the uprising, Generals Viest and Golian. After the occupation of Banská Bystrica on 27 October, they had retreated to the Donovaly mountain pass and reached the village of Pohronský Bukovec, where they were arrested by members of Einsatzkommando 14 on 3 November. Both generals were interrogated in Bratislava and then brought to Berlin on 9 November. There is still no clear evidence of the generals' fate, but according to historian Šindelářová, everything points to them being shot in Flossenbürg concentration camp in February 1945.

In the course of combating the insurgency, Wehrmacht units and Einsatzgruppen also initiated extensive looting operations without taking into account the artificially maintained pseudo-sovereignty of the Slovak state. Despite protests from Slovak authorities, these were also extended to non-insurgent areas in Slovakia. At the end of December 1944, a German 'economic commissioner' was appointed, according to whom all raw material and food reserves were relocated to and, after the labour force, the industrial plants were also subjected to the full control of the Reich authorities. Hoensch (1994) comments: 'After the national uprising, Slovakia retained its "sovereign" façade merely for reasons of camouflage and was already viewed and treated as an "internal Reich problem".'

=== Persecution of Jews and Holocaust ===
The uprising that broke out at the end of August 1944 was taken by the German leadership as an opportunity to complete the extermination of the Jewish population in Slovakia. Unlike the deportations of 1942, this time the action was organized and carried out almost exclusively by German agencies from the very beginning. No letter of protection was recognized anymore. One fact remains that the highest Slovak bodies did not intend to continue the deportations of Jews, they even tried to prevent them. Nevertheless, at that time they still behaved in an anti-Jewish manner, because they did not want to take note of the real cause of the uprising as a general and open expression of rejection of the regime. On the question of the cause of the uprising and the decisive part played by the Jews in its preparation, outbreak and course, the Slovak and German government circles were of one mind.

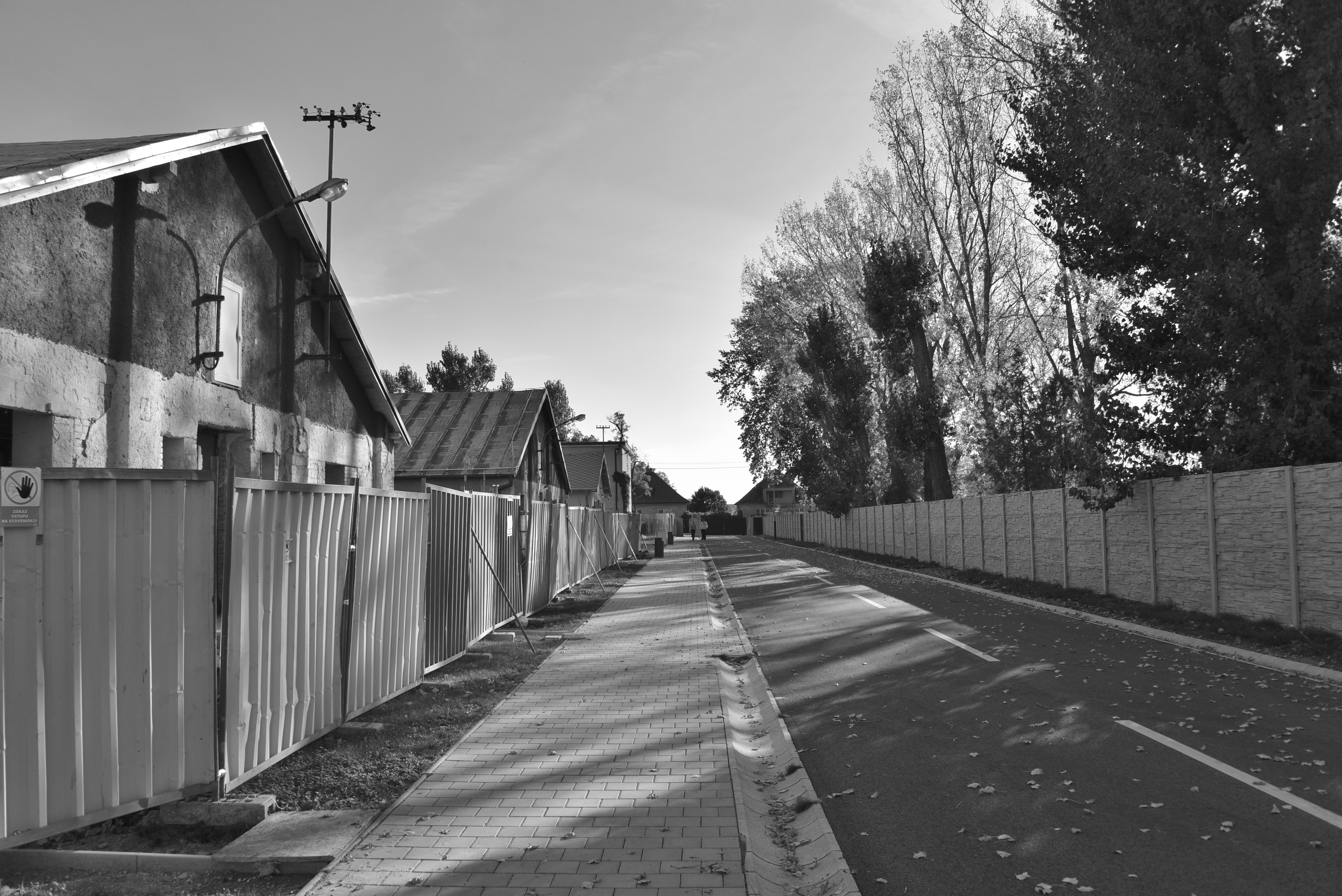
Site of the former Sereď concentration camp, from where Slovak Jews were deported to German concentration and extermination camps during and after the SNP.

The main role in the now proclaimed radical solution of the "Jewish question" was undoubtedly played by the Einsatzgruppe H under the command of Josef Witiska. Its activities effectively meant the arrest of Jews and their subsequent deportation from Slovakia or their murder on Slovak soil. The actions began immediately after the arrival of Einsatzgruppe H and its first two Einsatzkommandos, 13 and 14. Larger raids with numerous arrested Jews took place in the first days of September, especially in Topoľčany and Trenčín; the largest raid against Jews was carried out in the Slovak capital at the end of September 1944, when 1,600 Jews were arrested. The arrest was usually carried out by members of Einsatzgruppe H, often with the assistance of Slovaks or Volksdeutsche. This was followed by the transfer of those arrested to the nearest prison, where they were registered and in some cases interrogated (under torture) in order to learn from them the whereabouts of other hidden Jews.

The majority of the arrested Jews were subsequently transferred to the Sereď concentration camp. The site near Trnava had already served as a concentration camp during the 1942 deportations and, after its completion in September 1942, as a labour camp for up to 1,200 Jews until the end of August 1944, and was taken over by German authorities during the first days of September (immediately after the German invasion, all but 15 remaining Jews had fled the camp). SS-Hauptsturmführer Alois Brunner, one of Adolf Eichmann's most important collaborators in the realization of the genocide of Slovak Jews, was ordered to Slovakia to organize the subsequent transport of Jews from Sereď to the extermination camps. Upon his arrival in Sereď, deportations from Slovakia resumed immediately and were to continue for the next six months until the end of March 1945. By the end of the war, more than 14,000 Jews (in addition to the approximately 58,000 deportees of 1942) had been deported or murdered on Slovak territory.

Thanks to the help of fellow Slovaks, however, about 10,000 Jews, some of whom fought in the armed uprising, were saved even during this second phase. In terms of numbers, Slovaks are among the most frequent recipients of the Israeli Righteous Among the Nations award, which the State of Israel bestows for the rescue of Jews. Nevertheless, the "solution of the Jewish question" in World War II, which resulted in the genocide, in fact initiated the disintegration of the closed Jewish community in Slovakia. The waves of emigration in 1945, 1948 and 1968 then brought its definitive end.

=== Casualty figures and war damage ===
Estimates of the total number of soldiers and partisans of the insurgents killed from the beginning of the uprising until the liberation, as well as the number of fallen German soldiers, are estimated today to be about 7,500 soldiers and 2,500 partisans, whereby the Slovak insurgents lost approximately 3,000 men during the national uprising (mostly soldiers but also partisans) and about 1,000 others who already died in captivity. Through the research work of Slovak historians, about 1,500 victims could be identified so far. The number of German soldiers killed in the uprising's skirmishes could not be objectively quantified until today, according to historian Martin Lacko (2008). In an anthology on the history of the Slovak National Uprising published in 1985, so still in socialist Czechoslovakia, the authors state the following German losses: 4,200 fallen soldiers, 5,000 wounded and 300 prisoners.[188] The number of German soldiers killed in the Slovak National Uprising was not mentioned.

Data on casualties as a result of the Nazi occupation policy in Slovakia from September 1944 to March 1945 mostly vary between 4,000 and 5,000 people, with about 2,000 of them being Jews. The Museum of the Slovak National Uprising (Múzeum SNP), in its 2009 publication, estimates that from September 1944 to the end of April 1945, a total of 5,305 people were murdered and interred in 211 mass graves. 102 villages and communities were completely or partially razed to the ground.

In addition, the German occupation forces destroyed or confiscated 800 motorized vehicles and 267 aircraft. The total damage caused in Slovakia during the uprising and the frontline passage was estimated at about 114 billion crowns after the war. Roads, bridges and rails were destroyed. Only 22 of the original nearly 700 locomotives remained. The majority of tunnels and railroad bridges were buried or destroyed, and road communications fared similarly, with about 1,500 bridges destroyed and 500 more damaged.

=== Significance for the political position of Slovakia after 1945 ===
The importance of the Slovak National Uprising was not so much on the military level, but on a political and moral level. Due to the defeat of the uprising, the political expectations of the politicians of the uprising were only partially fulfilled. With the realization of the uprising, they were able to free Slovakia from the burden of the previous collaboration with the Third Reich, gained significant influence, and their political views had to be taken note of in London as well as in Moscow. Nevertheless, they were fully dependent on outside forces for liberation, which significantly worsened their position for the post-war era. On the liberated Slovak territory, which was gradually handed over to the civil administration by the Red Army, the Slovak National Council was still able to maintain a de facto monopoly on power. Only after the full establishment of the new Czechoslovak government in Prague, from 1945 to 1948 or 1960, there was a gradual dismantling of all elements of national-political self-government, which the Slovaks had won over Czech politics through the uprising. The political goals of the civic democrats and communists involved in the uprising were not taken into account in the post-war period. The democrats managed to protect Slovakia from a communist regime only until February 1948. The Slovak communists did not fare much better, the majority of whom were sent to communist prisons as part of the internal party purges of the 1950s. Nevertheless, the uprising, with its struggle for political freedom and national self-government, gave Slovakia ideals to which it proudly professed at that time and still professed after 1989.

=== Legal reconditioning ===
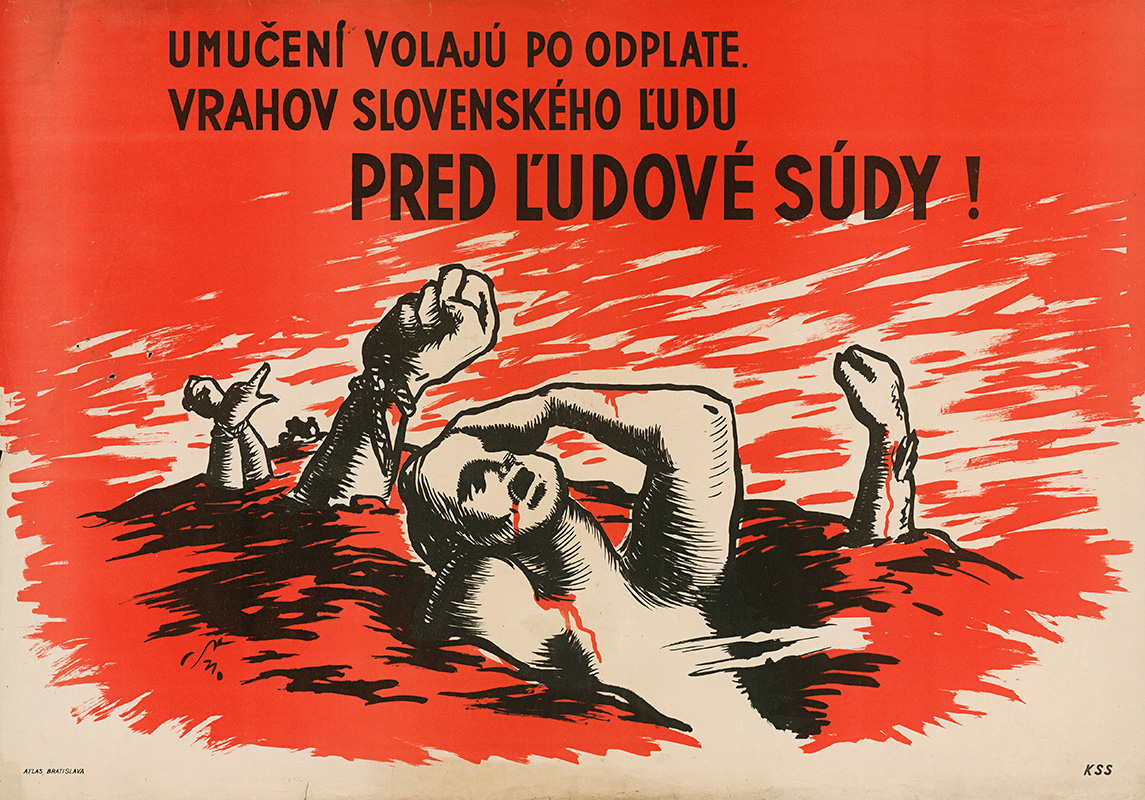
Propaganda poster of the Slovak National Council 1946: "The martyred call for retribution. Murderers of the Slovak people before the people's courts!"

The Slovak state ceased to exist after six years, yet in the first years of the re-established republic there were areas that belonged exclusively to the competence of the Slovak National Council, the legislative body of the autonomous administration in Slovakia, and thus were removed from the decision-making power of the central government in Prague. One of these areas was the prosecution of crimes committed since 1938. This was based on the relevant Allied agreements that had been concluded during or shortly after the war. The decree, prepared by the Czechoslovak government-in-exile in London and containing the provisions for the prosecution of Nazi and war criminals, was rejected by the Slovak National Council, with the result that Czechoslovakia ultimately proceeded in this sphere according to two different sets of standards. In the western part of the republic, the basic norm was the so-called Great Retribution Decree of June 19, 1945; in Slovakia, it was the Decree of the Slovak National Council No. 33/1945, which had already entered into force a month earlier.

Regarding the 100 SS leaders of Einsatzgruppe H examined in the study by Czech historian Lenka Šindelářová, the following picture emerges: a total of five SS leaders were convicted by the Czech People's Courts with final effect. None of these, however, were held accountable for the crimes committed in Slovakia – all of them had to answer for their earlier activities in the Protectorate of Bohemia and Moravia. Three death sentences and two prison sentences of five and twelve years were handed down. Only one of the 100 SS leaders had to stand trial in Slovakia. Others were investigated, but the results were not sufficient to bring the accused to trial. In the Federal Republic, not a single SS leader of Einsatzgruppe H was convicted for his activities in Slovakia. Nevertheless, some of them had to answer to a Federal German court for their actions during the war and in some cases even had to serve a prison sentence. A total of ten SS leaders of Einsatzgruppe H were convicted in the Federal Republic of Germany for crimes involving killing committed outside Slovakia. In addition to Czechoslovakia and the Federal Republic, members of Einsatzgruppe H were also held accountable in other countries and in some cases convicted with final effect. Four commando leaders were sentenced to death and subsequently executed.

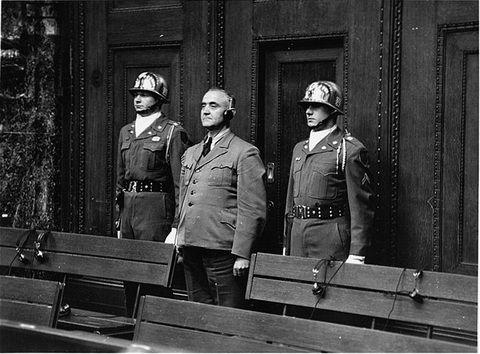
Gottlob Berger at the Nuremberg Trials (1949)

However, other people were convicted by Slovak People's Courts with final effect who can be seen more or less in relation to the activities of Einsatzgruppe H. For example, on December 3, 1947, the National Court in Bratislava sentenced the former German envoy in Bratislava, Hanns Elard Ludin, and the German commander in Slovakia, Hermann Höfle, to death by hanging. Both were found guilty on a total of 27 counts, their crimes consisting mainly of participating in the "political, economic and other oppression of the Slovak people. Höfle fought with the German army on the territory of the Czechoslovak Republic against the Red Army, against other armies of the Allies, the Slovak National Uprising and the partisans in Slovakia; both were in the service of Nazi Germany, gave orders and participated in the deportation of Slovak citizens abroad." The death sentences were carried out on December 9, 1947. On February 27, 1948, the "Commissioner for Jewish Affairs" for Slovakia, Dieter Wisliceny, was also executed in Bratislava. The first German commander, Gottlob Berger, on the other hand, could not be seized by the Czechoslovak organs.

Another trial before the National Court in Bratislava, namely that against the former president of the Slovak state, Jozef Tiso, caused a much greater stir. He was joined on trial by the former Slovak Minister of the Interior, Alexander Mach, and the former Minister of the Interior and Foreign Affairs, Ferdinand Ďurčanský. The controversial verdict was handed down on April 15, 1947. Tiso was sentenced to death by hanging and the death penalty was carried out three days later. The court also imposed a death sentence on the absent Ďurčanský. Mach, on the other hand, was sentenced to 30 years in prison, although the sentence was later reduced to 25 years and Mach was ultimately released early in 1968 thanks to an amnesty. In another trial before the National Court on November 11, 1947, the other ministers who had taken up their posts on September 5, 1944, were also convicted, like Minister of Defense Štefan Haššík in absentia to death by firing squad. Others received varying sentences for imprisonment, e.g., former Prime Minister and Minister of Foreign Affairs Štefan Tiso (30 years), Minister of Finance Mikuláš Pružinský (six years), Minister of Economy Gejza Medrický (seven years), Minister of Education and National Enlightenment Aladár Kočíš (six years), and Minister of Transport and Public Works Ľudovít Lednár (four years). Furthermore, in August 1946, the National Court sentenced Otomar Kubala, Chief of Staff of the Hlinka Guard and State Secretary for Security, to death and subsequently shot him.

== Reception ==
=== Contemporary interpretations (1944–1945) ===
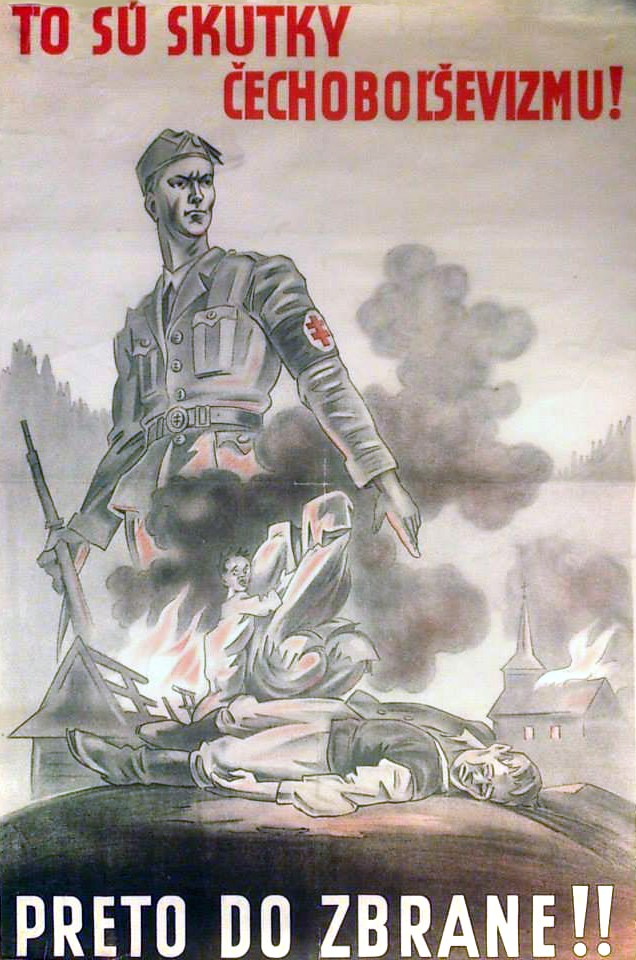
Propaganda poster of the Ludaks against the uprising: "These are the deeds of Czecho-Bolshevism – This so take up arms!"

In September and October 1944, the representatives of the Slovak collaborationist regime labelled the uprising as small, unprepared, meaningless and foreign – This the work of "non-Slovak elements": the so-called Czechoslovaks, Czechs, Jews, Russian paratroopers and domestic traitors. For President Tiso and the leadership of the Hlinka party, the Slovak National Uprising was a purely communist-inspired conspiracy to which a small section of the Slovaks had allowed themselves to be misused by the pretence of false facts. They saw the collapse of their state as a historical misunderstanding, which they believed to be due to the intervention of a foreign power and a foreign will imported from Moscow and London. Sympathisers of the ruling Hlinka party and their ideological successors perceived and still perceive it as a criminal, anti-national, pro-Czech, pro-Bolshevik and anti-Christian or Lutheran conspiracy, as terrorism against state sovereignty and a fratricidal civil war. After the suppression of the uprising, the German patron's need to proclaim a great victory prevailed – This consequently, the official Slovak press also reclassified the "putsch" as an "uprising".

President Beneš in exile wanted to see the Slovak National Uprising as confirmation of his loyalty to pre-war Czechoslovakia. However, his government in exile in London also had to accept the self-confident behaviour of the Slovak national bodies and after 1945 it proved difficult to return to pre-war centralism. The majority of Slovak non-communist organisers and participants expected a new joint democratic state of Slovaks and Czechs based on the principle of equal rights.

=== Judgement in post-war democratic Czechoslovakia (1945–1948) ===
On the first anniversary of the SNP, which was celebrated on 29 August 1945, the foundation stone for the memorial to the victims of the uprising was laid with the participation of Czechoslovak President Beneš. The celebrations were intended to mobilise people to rebuild war-ravaged Slovakia within the framework of Czechoslovakia and, above all, to send a message: The war had been "anti-fascist" and "fascists" were responsible for all atrocities and crimes. The following SNP anniversaries reflected the loss of authority of the Slovak national institutions in favour of the Prague institutions. The insurgents' ideas about the federalisation of Czechoslovakia had not been implemented – This not only because of the disobedience of the Czech side, but also because of the political conflict between Slovak democrats and communists, with the latter becoming instruments of the renewal of centralism.

=== Reinterpretations in communist Czechoslovakia (1948–1989) ===
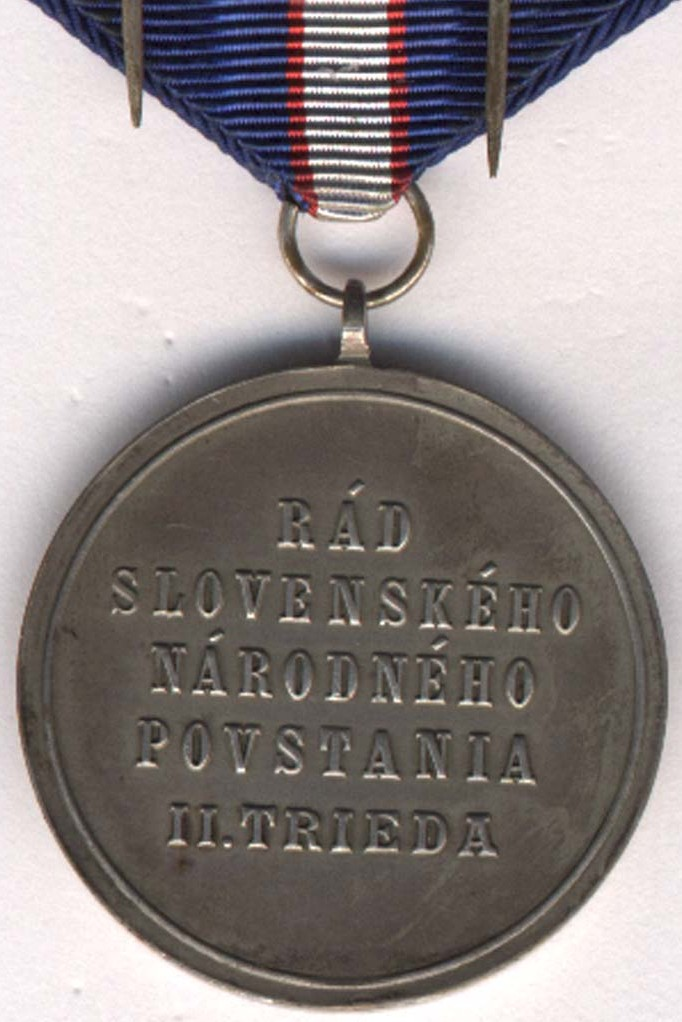
The Order of the SNP II. Class, awarded by the ČSSR for participation in the uprising

After coming to power in February 1948, the Communist Party of Czechoslovakia gained the exclusive right to administer the "historical legacy" of the Slovak National Uprising. After the February coup in 1948, the already insignificant competences of the Slovak National Council, once the highest body of the 1944 Uprising, were reduced to a minimum of representative functions. Next, generals of the Czechoslovak army, insofar as they were Slovaks and former prominent members of the uprising, were dismissed and imprisoned. All those insurrection leaders who were non-communists were denounced, persecuted and excluded from any honour (such as Jozef Lettrich, Ján Ursiny, Viliam Žingor and Matej Josko). This process was already completed by 1949. On the 5th anniversary in 1949, it was declared that the Communist Party had been the "sole leading and organisational force of the uprising" and that Klement Gottwald had "personally prepared the uprising from Moscow and Kiev" and led it from there. The Slovak National Uprising had strengthened the "fraternal bond between Czechs and Slovaks in a unified and indivisible state".

According to Slovak historian Elena Mannová (2011), the assessment of the uprising from 1949 to 1964 in communist Czechoslovakia was characterised by a denationalisation of the memory of the national uprising:

"The construction of the 'socialist Czechoslovak people' began, cheerfully building socialism shoulder to shoulder with the Soviet Union. The initiative of those who already had experience of fighting against an undemocratic regime was not welcome. Political purges, intimidation and the political trials of the 1950s, which also affected many of the former insurgents, generally did not allow dissenting interpretations of the SNP to be expressed publicly."

The historical propaganda defined the event as "communist", internal party rivals were labelled as "fake communists" and criminalised as traitors. Power struggles between the leaders of the Slovak and Czech CPs played out as a variant of the campaign against so-called civic nationalism that took place in all multi-ethnic communist states. After Yugoslavia's break with the Soviet Union, several leading Slovak communists were accused of (alleged) anti-Czech "bourgeois" nationalism. Calls for a federal organisation of Czechoslovakia, which had been raised during the SNP, were seen as the first step towards future secession.

At the IX Party Congress of the Czechoslovak Communists in 1950, the communist uprising leaders of 1944 were subsequently accused of "bourgeois nationalism". On 18 April 1951, Husák and Novomeský were accused at a meeting of the Central Committee of the KSS of having been prepared to switch to the position of the class enemy during the uprising. Novomeský and Husák were put on trial, and in December 1952 the former chairman of the Slovak National Council of 1944, the former communist Karol Šmidke, died under unexplained circumstances. The German historian Wolfgang Venohr (1992) writes:

"Afterwards it was clear that the fact and legacy of the Slovak uprising of 1944 fitted the Czech Stalinist communists under Gottwald just as poorly as it had previously fitted the Czech civic forces under Beneš. In Prague, it was quickly realised that the uprising had far more than mere historical significance, that it would inevitably become fodder for all Slovak emancipation and equality aspirations if its tradition was not brought under control as quickly as possible and deformed in the desired sense. [...] Everything that appeared on the Czechoslovak book market in 1954 on the tenth anniversary of the uprising was nothing but historical fabrication of the most primitive kind [...]".

Coat of Arms of Czechoslovakia 1960-1990

Wolfgang Venohr summarises the "new authoritative interpretation of the uprising" in the following six points:

- The uprising was a matter for the entire Slovak people under the leadership of the Communists.
- The uprising was to be regarded merely as part of the overall Czechoslovak resistance.
- The uprising was prepared and organised by the communist Gottwald group in Moscow.
- In military terms, the uprising was carried out by the partisans and not the Slovak army units.
- The uprising could never have taken place without the active support of the Soviet Union.
- The uprising ultimately failed due to the incompetence of the Slovak army officers and the intrigues of the Beneš clique in London.

Gustáv Husák and his comrades were released from prison in 1960, but were not morally rehabilitated until the end of 1963 for fear that after the rehabilitation of the "Slovak bourgeois nationalists", their political programme from the SNP era could be renewed. The new constitution of 1960 completely demoted the Slovak National Council and subordinated the administration directly to Prague. In addition, the Slovak double cross was replaced by a fire on Mount Kriváň, which was intended to symbolise the Slovak National Uprising, in the coat of arms of the country, which was now called the Czechoslovak Socialist Republic (ČSSR).

In the second half of the 1960s, the nationalisation of the memory of the uprising could no longer be halted. In 1968, aspects of the uprising that had previously been kept secret were being freely discussed in the press. For the first time since 1948, representatives of the democratic resistance appeared in the stands at local celebrations of the anniversary. The Soviet occupation and the subsequent so-called normalisation then put an end to pluralist remembrance. After 1969, the only official interpretation of the uprising that was binding for historians was Gustáv Husák's "national-communist" interpretation, which he had set out in his memoirs in 1964.

=== Valuation in today's Slovakia ===
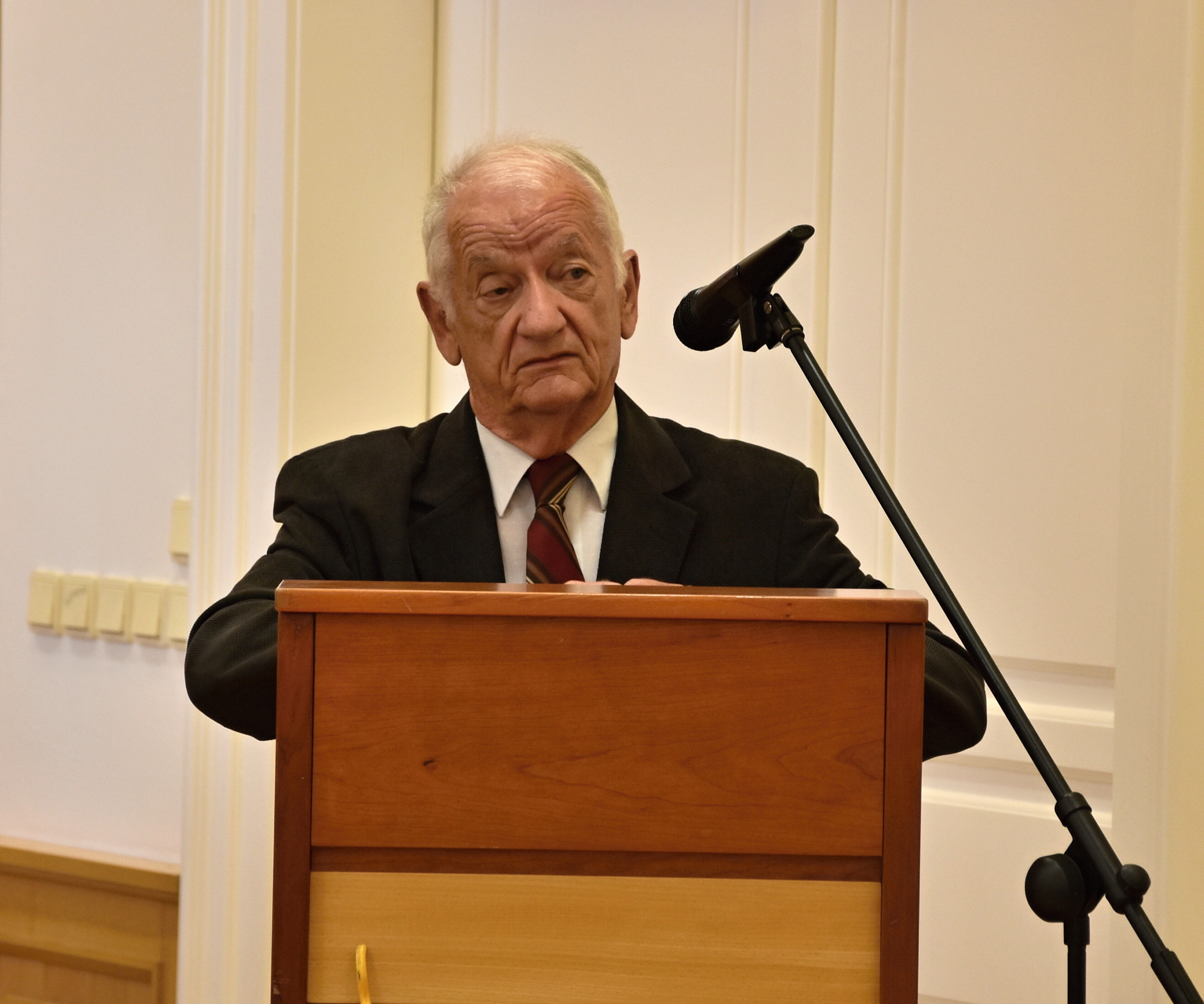
Slovak historian Ivan Kamenec at a conference of the Slovak Historical Society (2019).

The fall of the communist monopoly of power brought an end to canonised memory and the possibility of free discussion. The question of how to evaluate the uprising was raised by experts in April 1991 at the Xth meeting of the Slovak Historical Society (SHS). At this meeting, the majority accepted the concept of the dissident and historian Jozef Jablonický, as he presented it in 1990 in book form under the title Povstanie bez legiend (Uprising without Legends). The aim was to emphasise the importance of non-communist civic resistance and the role of the army, without denying the importance of the communists and the partisan movement. The Slovak governments after 1989 and 1993 accepted the uprising as a state tradition. The 50th anniversary was celebrated in August 1994 with the participation of six presidents. The Slovak army, which was formed in January 1993, acknowledged its tradition. Until 2005, the SNP anniversary celebrations took place only once every five years, but since 2006 the commemorations have been held annually. Since then, interest from foreign participants has also increased: while 15 foreign embassies took part in the celebrations in 2006, by 2013 there were already 27.

At the same time, there were attempts in the 1990s to establish interpretations that see the Slovak state of 1939 to 1945 as the predecessor and reference point of today's Slovakia. These views, represented above all by neo-Ludak historiography (Slovak historians in exile and some historians of Matica slovenská), regard the resistance as "anti-national" and the day of the beginning of the uprising as a "disaster" and an "unbelievable conspiracy". They sparked fierce controversy, but were rejected by the majority of historians. (Note: The most important Slovak historians in exile include Milan S. Ďurica, František Vnuk and Jozef Kirschbaum.) Slovak historian Ivan Kamenec explained the relationship between the Slovak National Uprising and the national question of the Slovaks in an interview on the occasion of the 70th anniversary of the SNP:

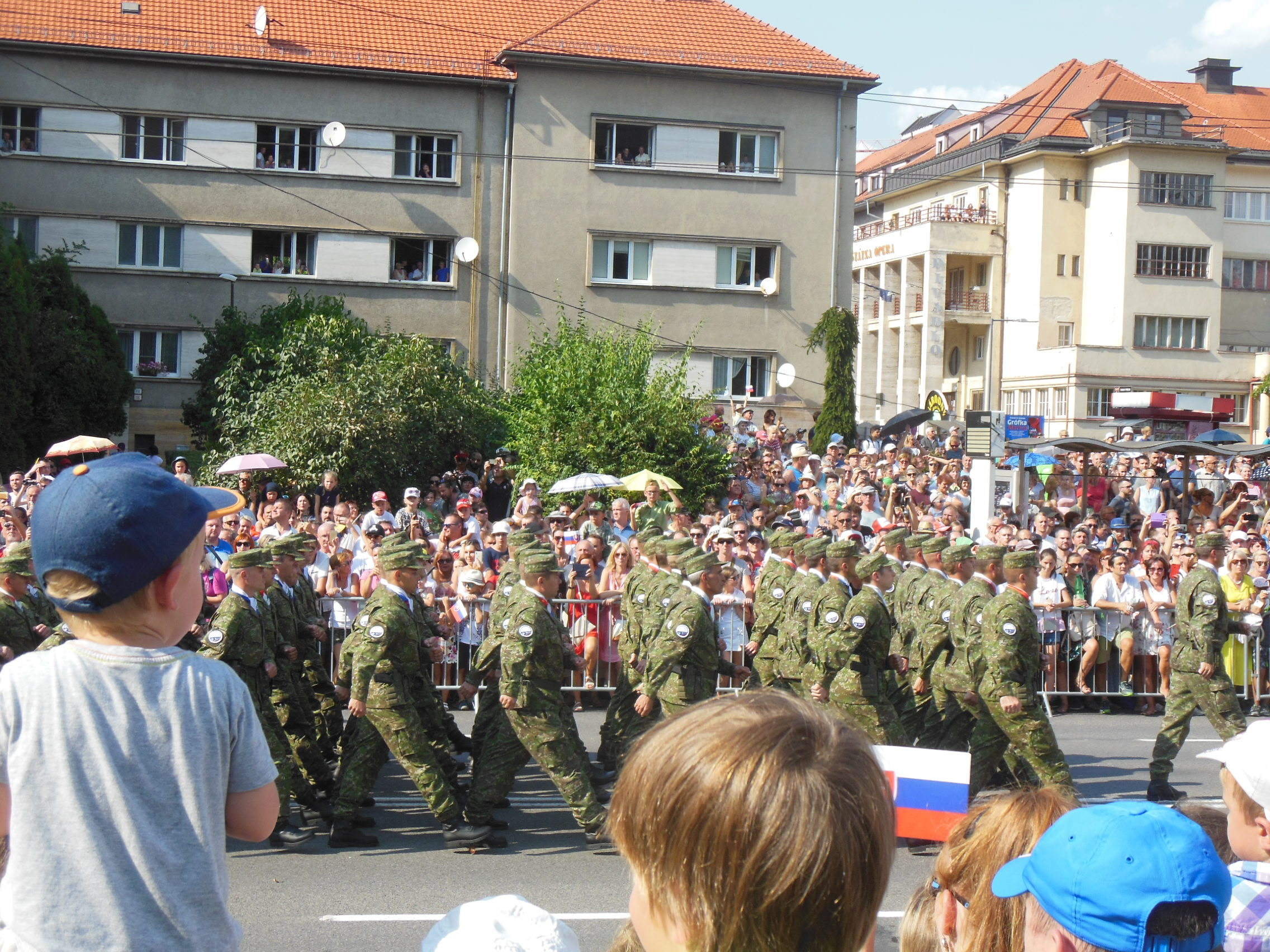
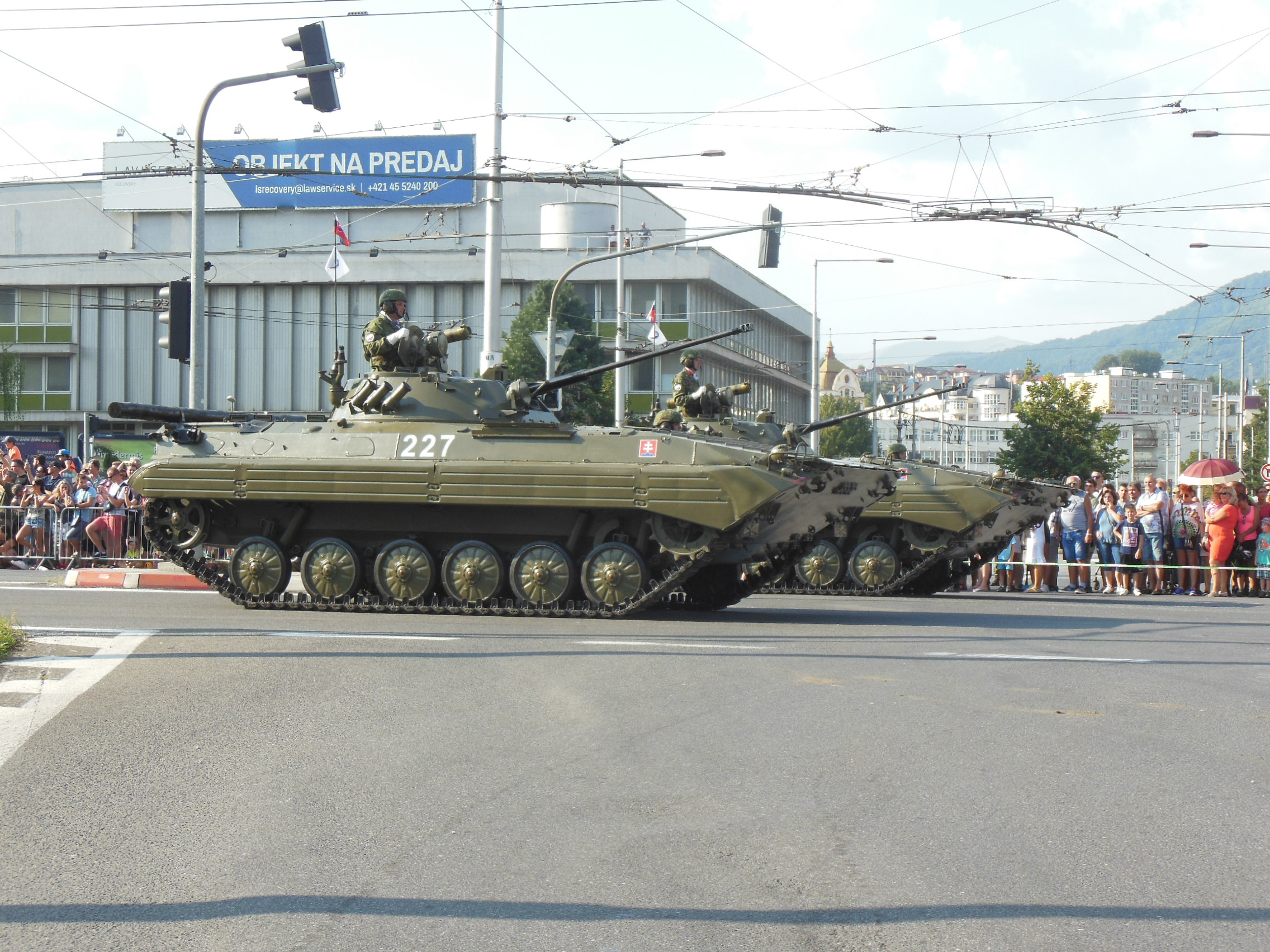
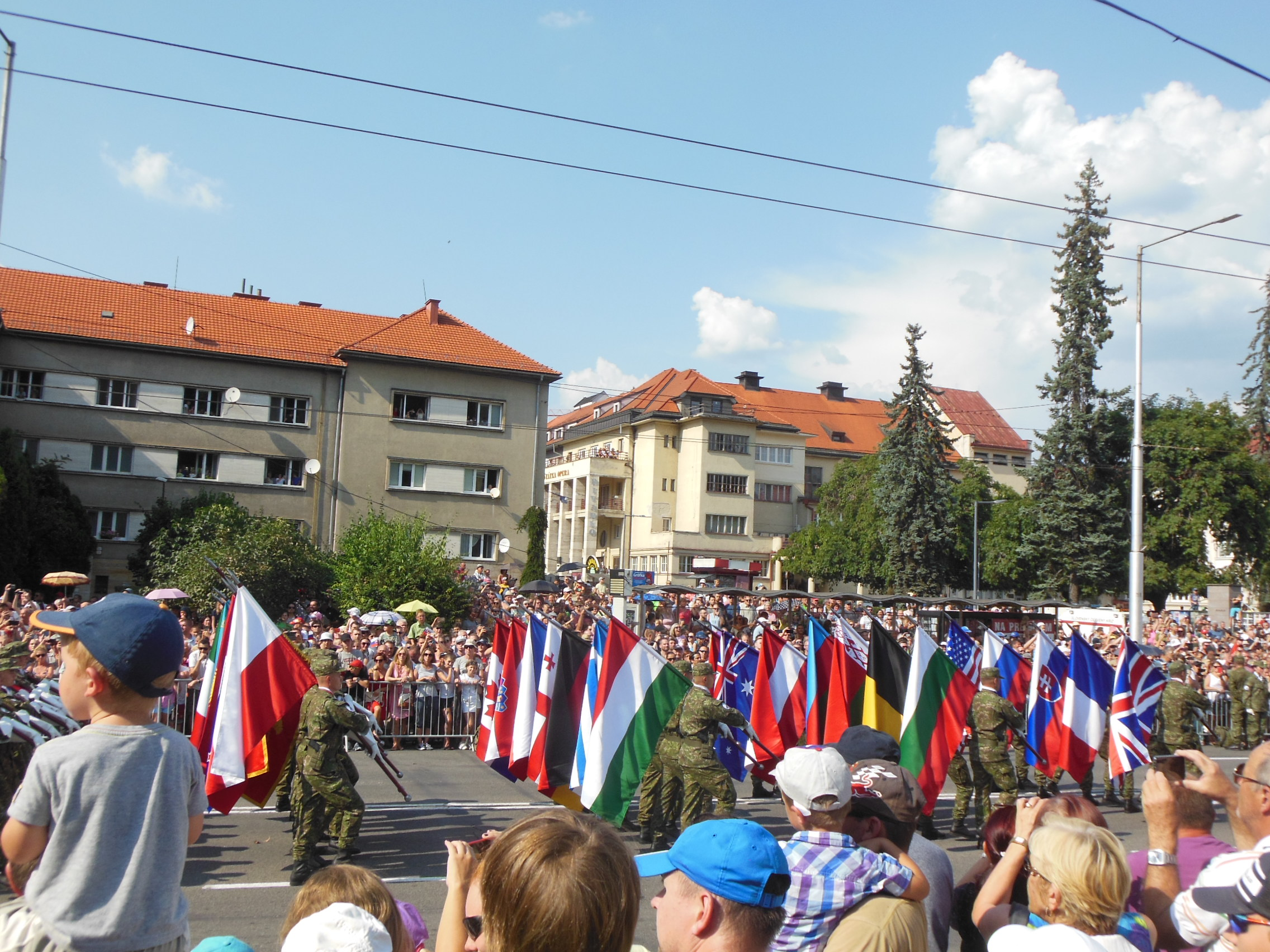

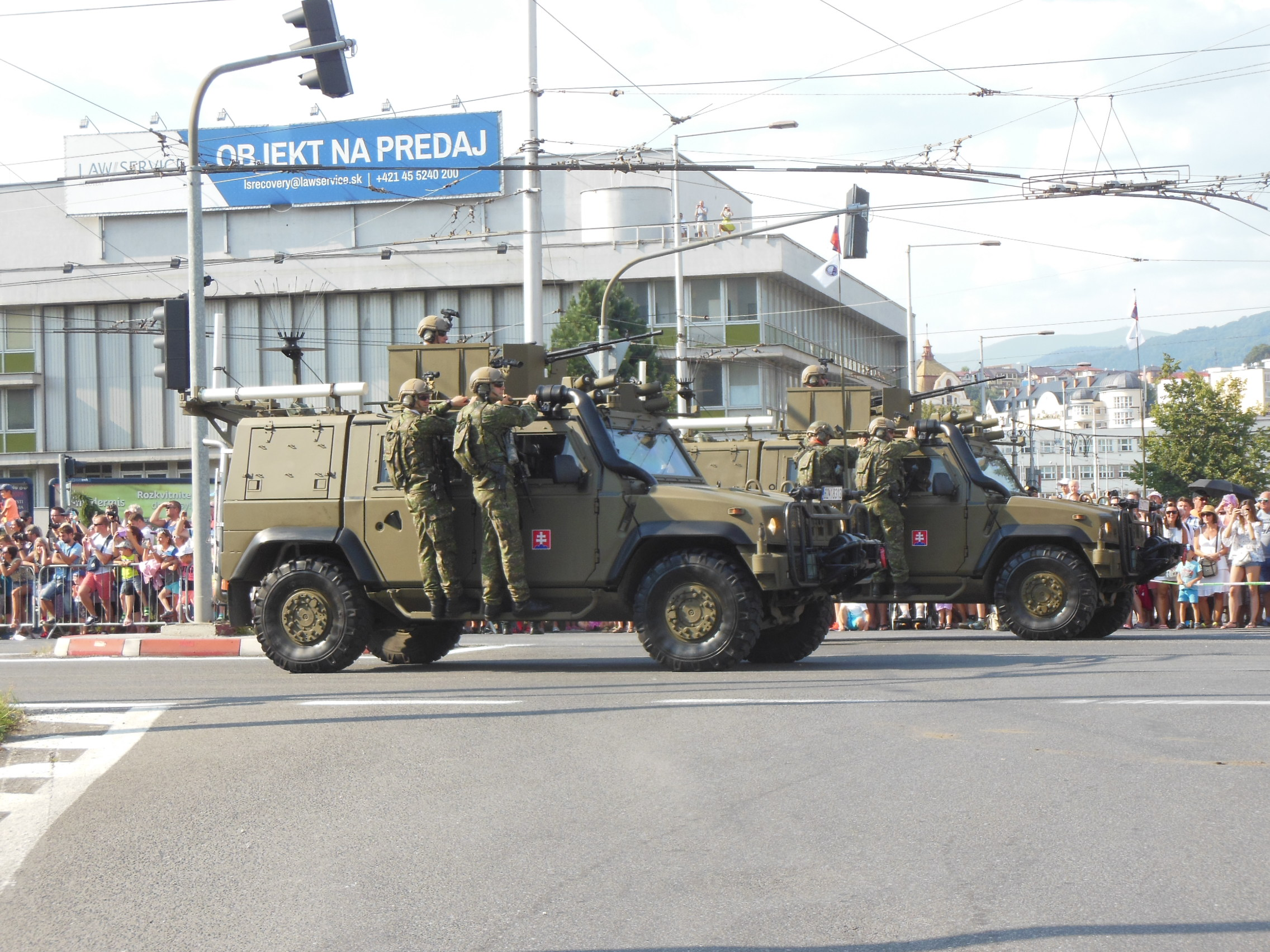
Snapshots of the military parade to mark the SNP's 75th anniversary (2019)

"The uprising did not negate Slovak statehood, only that form of state that existed after 1939 – This that is, a state with an undemocratic regime that had been created under pressure from Germany as a result of Nazi aggression against Czechoslovakia. When the Slovak National Uprising broke out, it declared its goals, one of which was the re-establishment of the Czechoslovak Republic, but not in the form that existed before Munich or after the 1920 constitution, which spoke of a 'Czechoslovak nation'. The uprising clearly demanded an equal position for Slovakia in the renewed republic."

The Slovak historian Martin Lacko (2008) also states with regard to the National Uprising that the military uprising grew from local roots, was prepared primarily by local people (economists, generals, officers) and was therefore primarily a Slovak affair. Opinions that have emerged since October 1944 that it was an action by "the Czechs" or "the Jews" are misconceived and in no way correspond to the truth. However, the uprising could hardly be understood as a national undertaking in the literal sense, as not even 80,000 of the 2,6 million Slovak citizens were armed and actively involved – This the majority of them as part of the mobilisation. The majority of the nation "did not join the uprising and showed no real interest in it". One could speak of an overall national aspect of the Slovak National Uprising rather in terms of its political and moral significance.

Symbolic references to the SNP are always latently present in Slovak political discourse. The themes of the uprising gave rise to political problems that still characterise the collective memory and the two competing historical cultures of the Slovaks today. The Slovak historian Elena Mannová (2011) writes about this:

"Very simplistically, the relationship between the SNP and the Slovak state in 1939–1945 could be seen as a dispute over the form of government (dictatorship versus democracy), or as a dispute over the constitutional order (Slovak nation versus statist Czechoslovakism). [...] As a people's liberation struggle against fascism, the SNP proved to be a 'useful past' (Jacques Rupnik) in the search for national and state identity in the 1960s and 1990s. The problem began as soon as the uprising was to be placed in its historical context, in relation to the previous period, in relation to the Slovak state. Many people reduce the SNP's ideological message to the rejection of German Nazism, but do not feel the need for a critical examination of the domestic authoritarian-fascist regime of the Slovak state."

Sociological studies show that for many citizens, no difficulties arise from the idea of incompatible pasts – This some respondents expressed a positive view of both the SNP and the Tiso regime. In the mid-1990s, at a time when society was strongly polarised by the conflict between "nationalists" and "cosmopolitans", the Slovak National Uprising was predominantly viewed in a positive light. In a representative survey conducted in 2003, the Slovak National Uprising was ranked fourth among the positive historical events after 1918. The most negatively rated event was the deportation of Jews from Slovakia. Among the most appreciated holidays, the Slovak National Uprising is also in fourth place. The Tatra Mountains were named as the strongest symbol by 51%, followed by the Christian cross (25%), Devín Castle (23%), the Slovak double cross (21%) – This and the monument to the Slovak National Uprising in Banská Bystrica (12%) as the only symbol of contemporary history. In a representative survey on the Slovak National Uprising conducted by the Focus opinion research institute in 2016, a total of 82 per cent of Slovaks stated that they considered it to be an event "we should be proud of". Diametrically opposed, 10 per cent of Slovaks thought the uprising was an event they should not be proud of.

In today's Slovakia, the Slovak National Uprising is criticised in particular by the far-right Kotleba party, which praises leaders of the Slovak state which collaborated with the Third Reich, as national heroes. Its party leader Marian Kotleba had black flags hoisted at the municipal office as regional president of Banská Bystrica on the anniversary of the Slovak National Uprising on 29 August 2015.

== International reception ==
The Slovak historian Stanislav Mičev, director of the Museum of the Slovak National Uprising in Banská Bystrica, lamented in 2014 on the occasion of the 70th anniversary that although it took place almost at the same time as the Warsaw Uprising, in Warsaw, there were more fighters on both sides and the battle zone was larger, so the Slovak National Uprising was a "largely forgotten uprising".

In German historiography, the Slovak uprising in autumn 1944 – This to the extent that the event has received any attention at all – This has essentially been portrayed as a national resistance struggle against the German "protecting power" and the clerical-authoritarian Tiso regime. According to Klaus Schönherr, this approach does justice to the events in principle, but in his opinion neglects to place the event in the context of the overall military situation in East-Central and South-East Europe. This is because – This according to Schönherr's assessment the uprising, in conjunction with the Red Army attack on the Beskid front that began a few days later, could develop into an eminent threat to the military and political position of the German Reich in south-east Europe. The operation of the 1st Ukrainian Front, which was still in the refreshment phase, could only be explained from this perspective. The Red Army would neither have wanted to nor been able to miss the opportunity to form an oversized bridgehead in the rear of Army Group North and South Ukraine by uniting with the insurgents.

The German historian Martin Zückert (2013) states that the Slovak National Uprising in 1944 was, alongside the Warsaw Uprising, the "largest uprising against the National Socialist system of rule and its allies in East-Central Europe." According to the Czech historian Lenka Šindelářová (2013), the Slovak National Uprising was also "one of the largest events in the history of armed resistance against National Socialism and the collaborating regimes in Europe".

The German journalist and historian Roland Schönfeld (2000) assesses the significance of the Slovak National Uprising and the dilemma of Slovak statehood from 1939 to 1945 as follows:

"Slovakia could not free itself from the embrace of its protecting power, Germany, without giving itself up. Its government and parts of the population had been guilty of collaborating with a foreign, amoral and criminal state. The uprising proved to the victorious powers that large sections of the Slovak people did not agree with this diabolical pact and were prepared to risk their lives to liberate their homeland from foreign, 'fascist' rule. The Slovaks were able to enter the Czechoslovak Republic, which was re-established after the war, as a people who had made their contribution to the Allied struggle against the enemy of the civilised world."

The German historian Wolfgang Venohr (1992) also emphasises:

"In a flat historical sense, the Slovaks were better off under Tiso than ever before in their history; materially as well as culturally. It remains all the more admirable and memorable that it was the Slovaks who re-established Czechoslovakia in their bold insurrectionary endeavour of 1944 and thus achieved the greatest political and military feat within the illegal resistance against fascism after Yugoslavia. For while Romanians, Bulgarians and Finns only turned their weapons against the Germans when the Soviet armies were deep in their forests, the Slovaks rose up before the Soviet tanks rolled through the valleys and villages of their homeland."

Furthermore, in the international volume on Czechoslovak history published in 1980 by Victor S. Mamatey and Radomír Luža, historian Anna Josko writes about the Slovak National Uprising:

"František Palacký claimed in his 'History of the Czech People' that nations engrave their names in history with blood. Through their resistance against German National Socialism and fascism of Slovak origin and through their struggle for democracy and freedom, the Slovak people have inscribed the new pages of their history with fire and blood. The Slovak National Uprising, in which the Slovak resistance movement culminated during the Second World War, became the high point of modern Slovak history and the history of Czechoslovakia. Together with the Warsaw Uprising, it was the most outstanding act of the resistance movement in Europe."

According to the Israeli historian Yeshayahu A. Jelinek (1976), the Slovak National Uprising also "saved the honour of the nation", which, according to the will of its rulers, was destined to remain the last ally of the German Reich.

Wolfgang Venohr also explored the question of whether the uprising in Slovakia in 1944 could really be described as a Slovak national uprising:

"The conspiracy from the summer of 1943 to the summer of 1944 was in fact only the affair of a small Slovak elite consisting of two dozen people, the majority of whom were officers. And the uprising itself was carried out by 40,000 to 50,000 soldiers; no more. But the surprising experience of the small Slovak nation of possessing revolutionary personalities of stature, of having given birth to a heroically fighting army from its own womb, and all this by its own efforts, almost without outside help, made the matter of autumn 1944 a "national" affair after all."

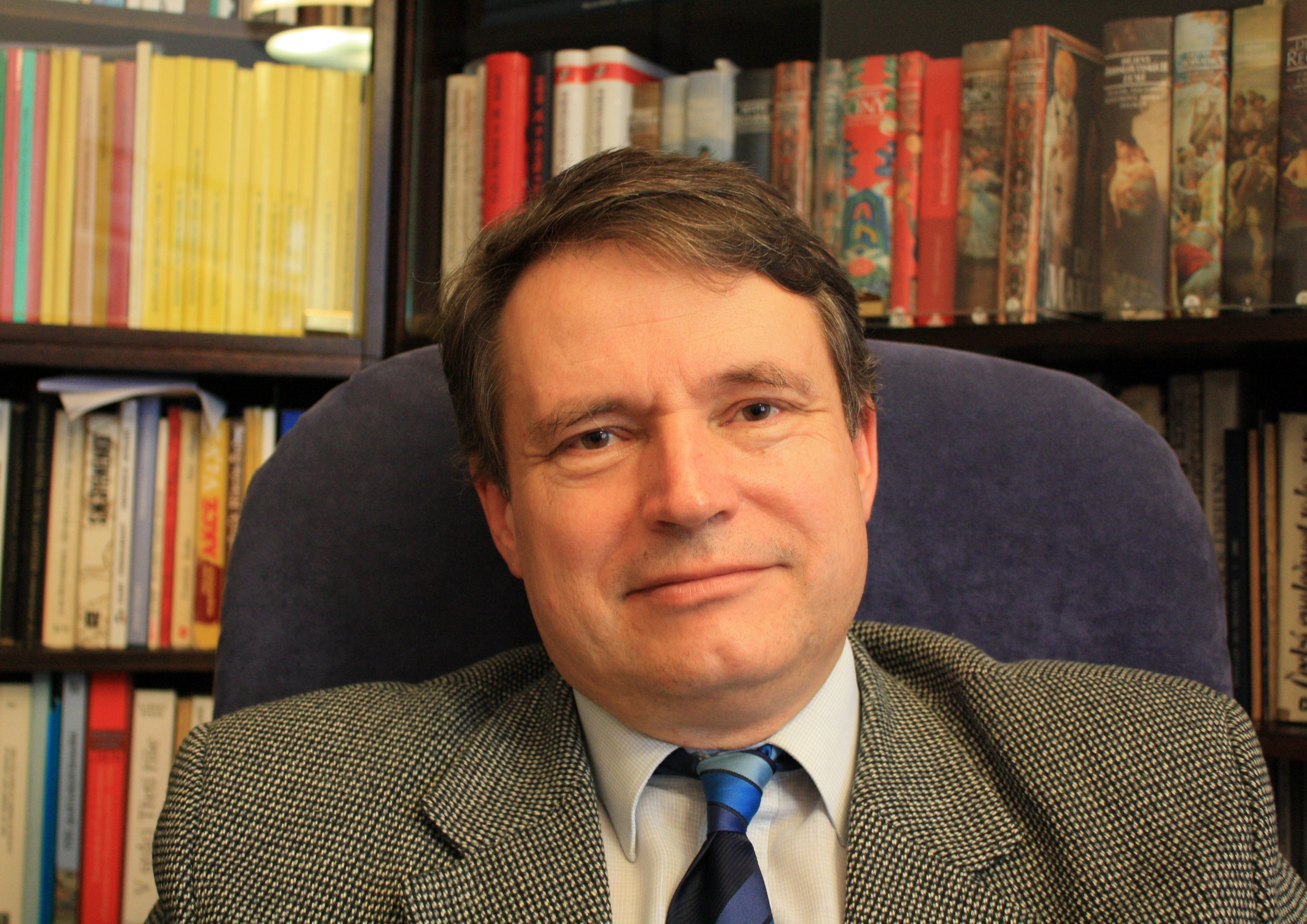
The Czech historian Jan Rychlík (2009).

Czech historian Jan Rychlík (2012) states that although the Slovak National Uprising was of course joined by the rest of the Jews remaining in Slovakia, as well as Czechs and members of other nations (a total of 30 different nations), the uprising was in fact Slovak, as evidenced by the number of Slovak soldiers and partisans. Furthermore, Rychlík also comments on the motif of the relationship between the uprising and Slovak statehood, which is often discussed in Slovak historiography. Rychlík emphasises that the Slovak National Uprising did not destroy the Slovak state, as the Great Powers had already decided on its dissolution. Although it is true that the Slovak National Uprising proclaimed the renewal of the Czechoslovak Republic, this would not have meant a resignation to Slovak statehood, which on the contrary was to be preserved and further developed within the framework of Czechoslovakia.

The American historian John L. Ryder (2014) investigated the question of whether the Slovak National Uprising could be considered an internal Slovak civil war. Ryder's approach is based on the definition of civil war by the American historian Alfred J. Rieber, who characterised the "civil war" as a "struggle between two relatively evenly matched armies, led by two hostile governments claiming authority over the same territory. Foreign policy is limited to manpower and equipment and this conflict does not grow into an international conflict." On the basis of this definition, Ryder considers the evidence for a civil war in Slovakia to be unfounded. It is true that both the Slovak National Council and the government of the Slovak state claimed legitimate authority within the state and threw large armies into the fight. Nevertheless, the role of the Wehrmacht as the main force against the insurgents was problematic, as only a few Slovaks (Domobrana, Hlinka Guards) fought against the insurgents and without Germany's intervention the internal conflict would not have come to a head. Furthermore, the German forces had clearly not fought to preserve the Ludak regime, but rather Slovakia had been occupied by a foreign army that was only interested in liquidating a dangerous enemy behind its own lines.

The German historian Martin Zückert (2014) again zoned in on the role of the partisan movement in Slovakia. Zückert notes that both the leadership of the uprising in Banská Bystrica and the Soviet partisan staff ultimately planned their integration into the military organisation, but that this transformation did not succeed, as neither the partisans could be integrated into the regular combat structure, nor could the uprising and its soldiers be permanently transformed into a partisan war.

== Research ==
While the German invasion of the USSR in June 1941 and the subsequent war in the Soviet Union have been intensively researched from a German perspective, the Slovak uprising in autumn 1944 and the defence of the Carpathian passes by the Army Group North Ukraine in the same period have received little attention from historians in the Federal Republic of Germany. Klaus Schönherr offers a detailed German language account of the fighting and a description of the individual units in the Slovak uprising. In his contribution Die Niederschlagung des Slowakischen Nationalaufstands im Kontext der deutschen militärischen Operationen, Herbst 1944, he also takes a critical look at Wolfgang Venohr's study, long regarded as the standard work in German historical research, in which he points out numerous factual errors in his work.[240] In a further contribution, Schönherr analyses how the Slovak National Uprising influenced the military situation of the German-Hungarian defensive front between the Vistula and the Southern Carpathians. In a further contribution, Schönherr analyses how the Slovak National Uprising influenced the military situation of the German-Hungarian defensive front between the Vistula and the Southern Carpathians.

Venohr's publication, which was published in 1969 under the title Aufstand für die Tschechoslowakei. Der slowakische Freiheitskampf von 1944 and 1983 under the title Aufstand in der Tatra. Der Kampf um die Slowakei 1939–1944 was also rejected by Tatjana Tönsmeyer as being a "justification for the German Wehrmacht". In 2013, Lenka Šindelářová's dissertation Finale der Vernichtung was published, in which the author deals with Einsatzgruppe H, which came to Slovakia in the late summer of 1944 to fight the resistance, as a representative of the crimes committed in the late phase of the Shoah. The book was published in German and English. In 2017, the German historians Martin Zückert, Jürgen Zarusky and Volker Zimmerman published the anthology Partisanen im Zweiten Weltkrieg. Der Slowakische Nationalaufstand im Kontext der europäischen Widerstandsbewegungen. The volume deals on the one hand with the emergence and organisation of the partisan movement in Slovakia and other European countries between 1939 and 1945, and on the other with the general political and social background of the partisan groups and the respective cultures of remembrance.

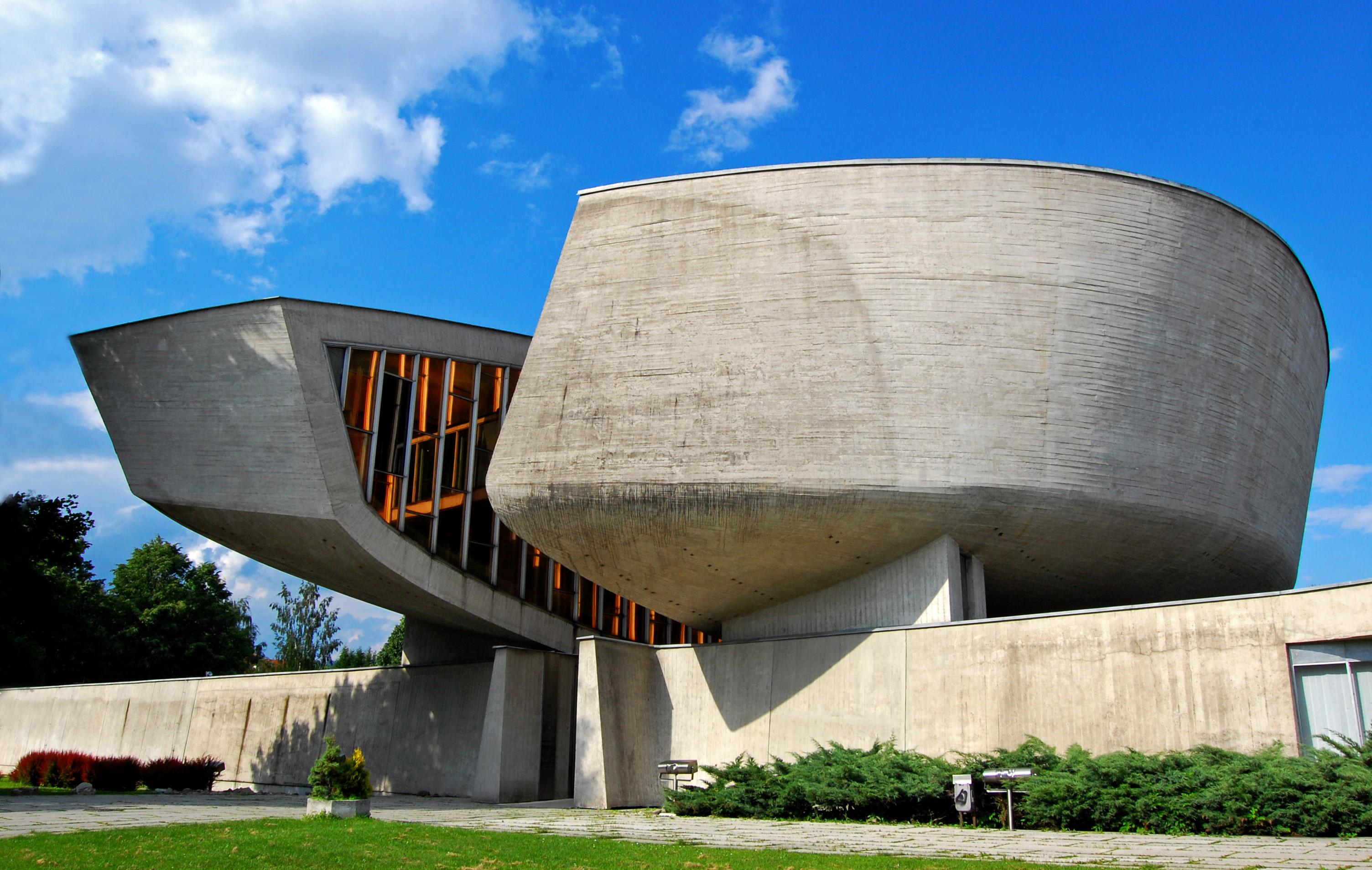
Monument to the SNP in Banská Bystrica, which also houses the Museum of the SNP (Múzeum SNP)

The German historian Klaus Schönherr sees two factors as decisive for the lack of interest in German historiography in the uprising and the defence battles of Army Group North Ukraine in the Beskids. Firstly, the incomplete files of Army Group North Ukraine and the subordinate units as well as the command authorities in the rear area of operations, which are held by the Bundesarchiv-Militärarchiv (Freiburg), would make more intensive research into this episode of the Second World War more difficult. Secondly, the fighting in the summer/autumn of 1944 in the other theatres of war – This such as France, the Balkans and the central and eastern sections of the Eastern Front – This had such a serious impact on events in the final phase of the Second World War that the events in Slovakia hardly received any attention.

Resistance research in Slovakia is very much focussed on the national uprising. An important institution in this regard is the "Museum of the Slovak National Uprising" (Slovak: Múzeum slovenského národného povstania) in Banská Bystrica. Under the editorial responsibility of Jan Julius Toth, Pavol Bosák and Milan Gajdoš, military scientific accounts of individual phases of the history of the uprising were produced in a highly professional quality, including works by Gajdoš on the 3rd Tactical Group and by Bosák on the 1st Tactical Group of the insurgent army. The unique volume of documents Slovenské národné povstanie by Vilem Prečan should also be emphasised. Research on the historiography of the Slovak National Uprising, for example by Jozef Jablonický, has pointed to the instrumentalization of the event and thus demonstrated the political function of these interpretations. In recent years, there have been increased attempts to place the resistance and uprising in the context of European history. Most recently, controversy has been caused by accounts of the uprising that criticise the role of the partisans and the Soviet Union.

== Remembrance in art, culture and society ==
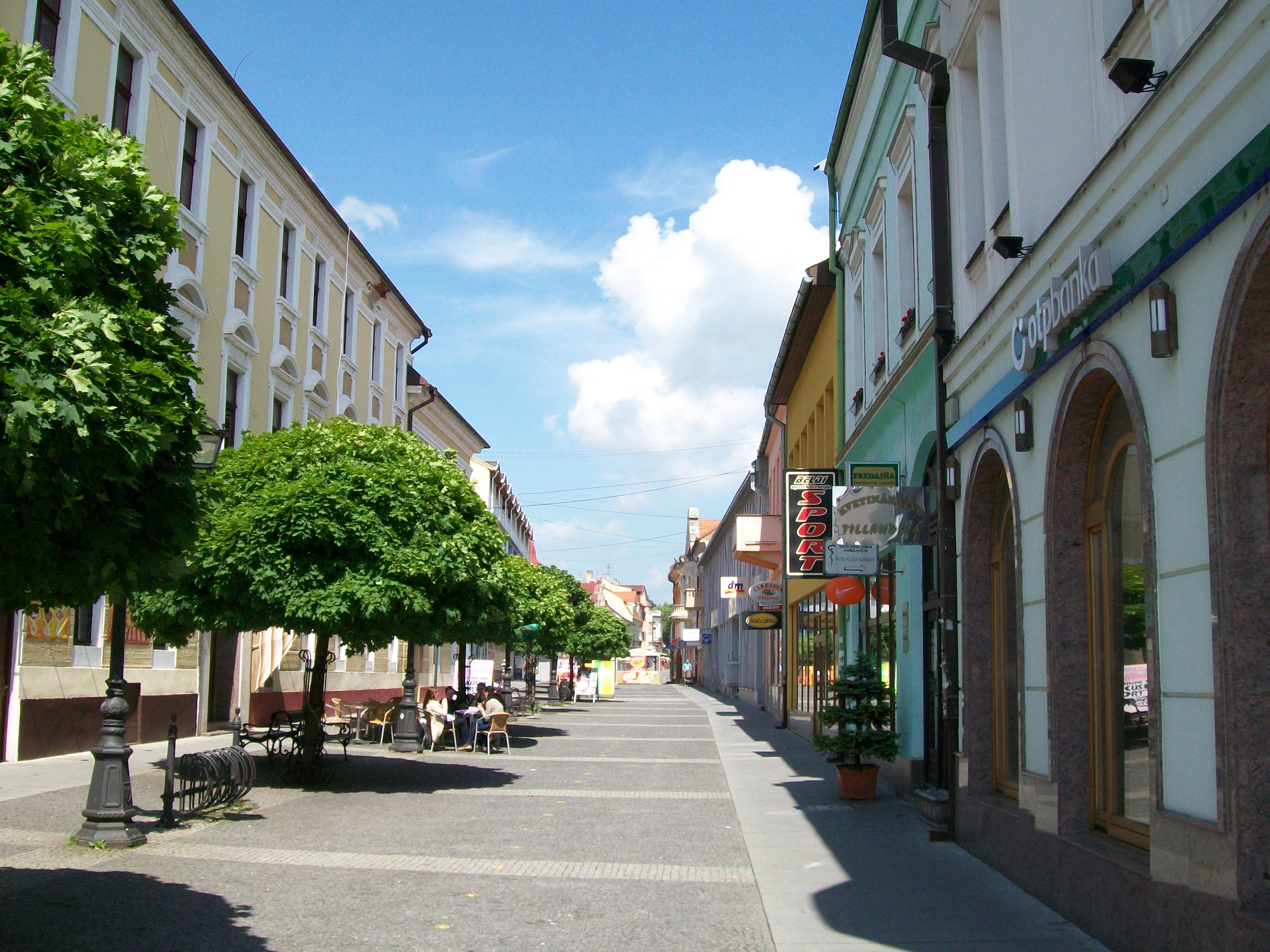
The Street of the SNP (Ulica SNP) in Rimavská Sobota (2013)

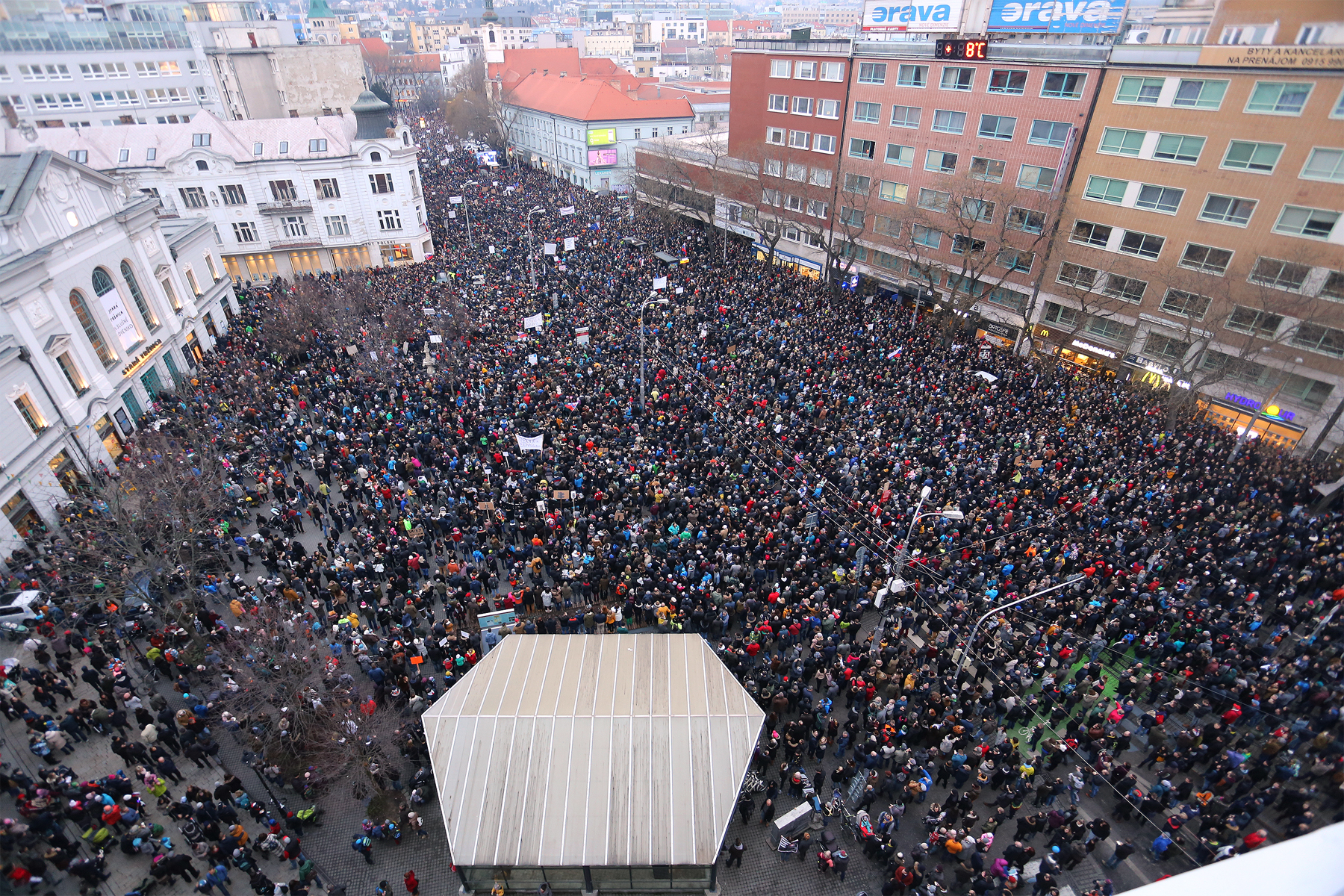
The SNP Square (Námestie SNP) in Bratislava during the demonstrations in the wake of the murder of journalist Ján Kuciak (2018)

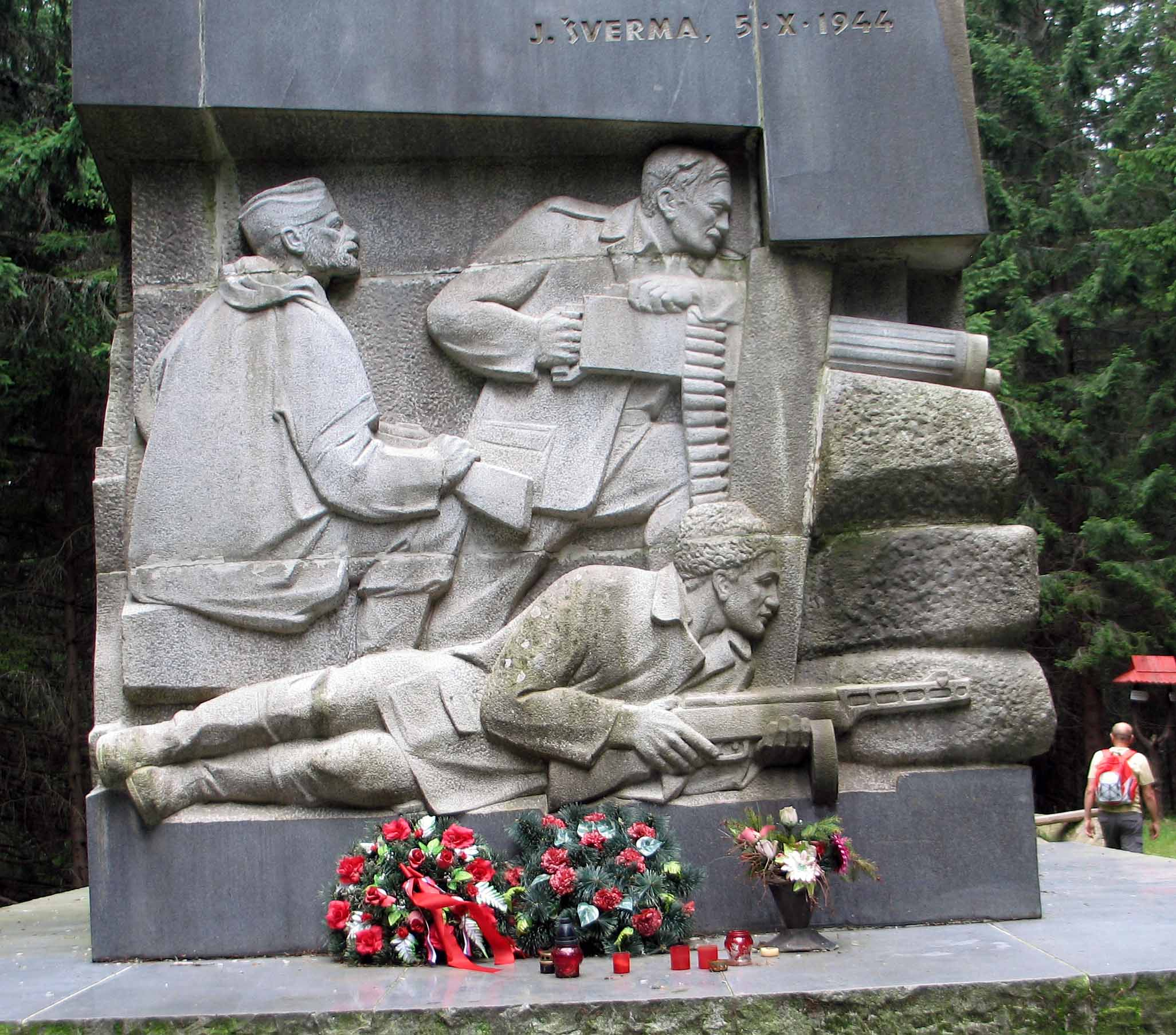
Relief of the Monument to the SNP (Pamätník SNP) in Jasná, Demänovská Dolina (2010)

The memory of the resistance against National Socialism and against its own authoritarian system of rule during the Second World War is still very important in Slovakia today, with the Slovak National Uprising at the centre of remembrance. Numerous cities have named a street or square after it The main squares of Banská Bystrica and Zvolen now bear the name of the SNP, as does the former market square in Bratislava since 1962. The Bridge of the SNP, which was built as the city's second bridge over the Danube, is also located in Bratislava. The 769 km long Cesta hrdinov SNP (SNP Heroes' Trail) runs from Devín Castle in Bratislava to the Dukla Pass as the most important main tourist route across Slovakia and is largely identical to the Slovak section of the E8 European long-distance hiking trail.

Even before 1989, the uprising was a top theme of Slovak film production, which produced over 100 films for the anniversary celebrations (mostly documentaries and around 40 feature films). The director Paľo Bielik made the family saga Vlčie diery ("Wolf Holes") with great pathos and clearly from the perspective of the victors, but also with vividly drawn characters beyond black-and-white thinking and using documentary footage directly from the uprising. The premiere was planned for the 4th anniversary of the SNP in August 1948, but some scenes had to be reworked due to ideological reservations: The film commission required an emphasis on "domestic betrayal" and the part played by Soviet liberators. As everywhere in public life, there were also binding ideological dogmas in cinematography from 1949 to 1955: national motifs were suppressed in connection with the spectres of "bourgeois nationalism". The theme of the uprising was only legalised in the second half of the 1950s. In the golden era of Slovak film from 1963 to 1970, various moral aspects of this event – This including partisan robbery in Juraj Jakubisko's Zbehovia a pútnici ("Deserters and Pilgrims", 1968) – could already be artistically processed and publicised. In the 1970s and 80s, only state-loyal images of the heroic partisan struggle against fascism made it into cinema and television.

Similar to the film, the Slovak National Uprising also had priority in the memorial scene before 1989: of the more than 2,700 political monuments to contemporary history that existed in Slovakia in 1976, 1,333 commemorated the uprising. Most of them were erected to mark an anniversary. In November 1989, Bratislava's largest square (SNP Square) became the stage for mass demonstrations that toppled the communist regime (Velvet Revolution). In 2018, following the murder of Slovak journalist Ján Kuciak, the largest demonstrations in Slovakia since 1989 began once more on SNP Square.

=== Films ===
Films produced in Czechoslovakia about the SNP (selection):

- Vlčie diery (= The Wolf Holes, 1948)
- Bílá tma (= The White Darkness, 1948)
- V hodine dvanástej (= Twelve o'Clock Sharp, 1958)
- Kapitán Dabač (= Captain Dabac, 1959)
- Prerušená pieseň (= The Interrupted Song, 1960)
- Pieseň o sivom holubovi (= The Song About the Silver Dove, 1961)
- Zbabělec (= The Coward, 1961)
- Polnočná omša (= The Midnight Mass, 1962)
- Bílá oblaka (= The White Clouds, 1962)
- Organ (= The Organ, 1964)
- Námestie svätej Alžbety (= The Place of St Elisabeth, 1965)
- Zvony pre bosých (= The Bell Tolls for the Barefoot, 1965)
- Keby som mal pušku (= If I Had a Rifle, 1971)
- V tieni vlkov (= In the Shadow of the Wolves, 1971)
- Horká zima (= The Harsh Winter, 1973)
- Trofej neznámeho strelca (= The Trophy from the Unknown Shooter, 1974)
- Rozhodnotie (= The Decision, 1975)
- Javorová fujarka (= The Maple Fujara, 1975)
- Jeden stříborný (= A Silver, 1976)
- Súkromná vojna (= The Private War, 1978)
- Zlaté časy (= Dream of Golden Times, 1978)
- Frontové divadlo (= The Front Theatre, 1979)
- Povstalecká história (= The Insurgent History, 1984)
- Čierny slnovrat (= The Black Solstice, 1984)

Films about the SNP produced in present-day Slovakia:

- Rozhovor s nepriateľom (= Conversation With the Enemy, 2006)
- Nedodržaný sľub (= The Unfulfilled Promise, feature film, drama, 2009, also distributed internationally as Broken Promise)
- Moje povstanie (= My Uprising; short feature film, 2014)
- Moje povstanie 2 (= My Uprising 2; feature film, 2019, online)
- Generál Golian (General Golian; biographical feature film, 2026, about gen. J. Golian and his family during 1943-1945)

=== Picture gallery ===
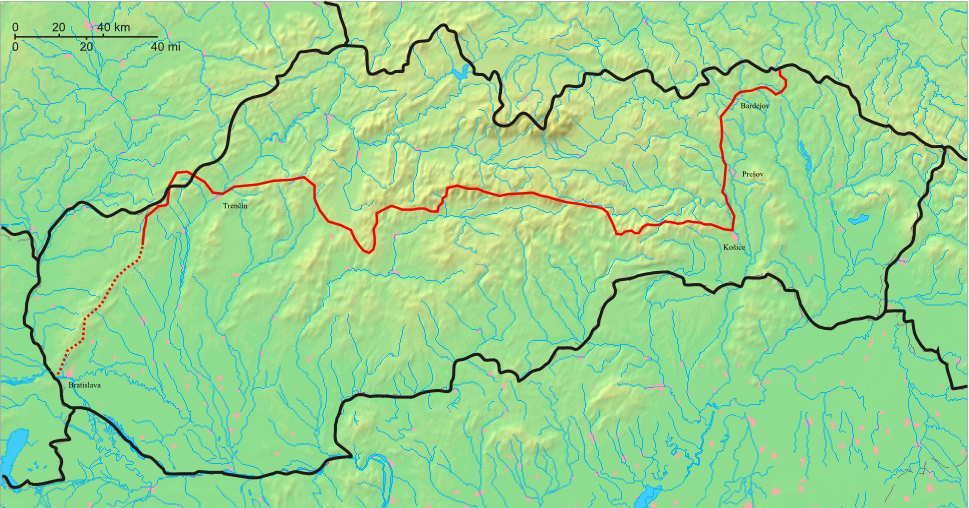
In red, the SNP Heroes' Trail (Cesta hrdinov SNP), the most important main tourist route in Slovakia

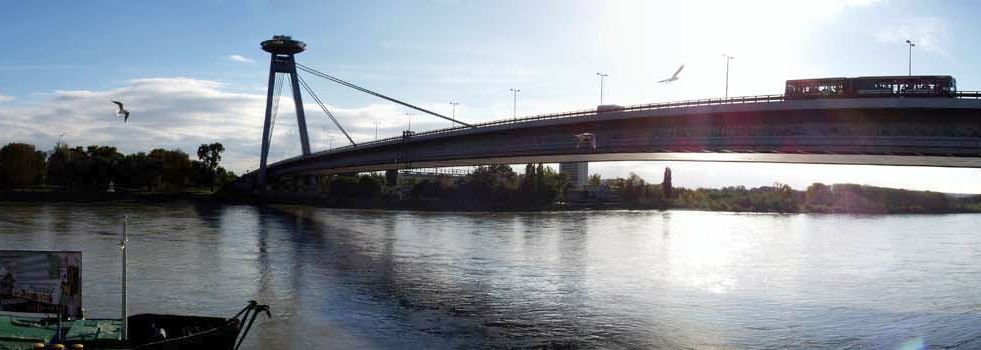
The Bridge of the SNP (Most SNP) in Bratislava

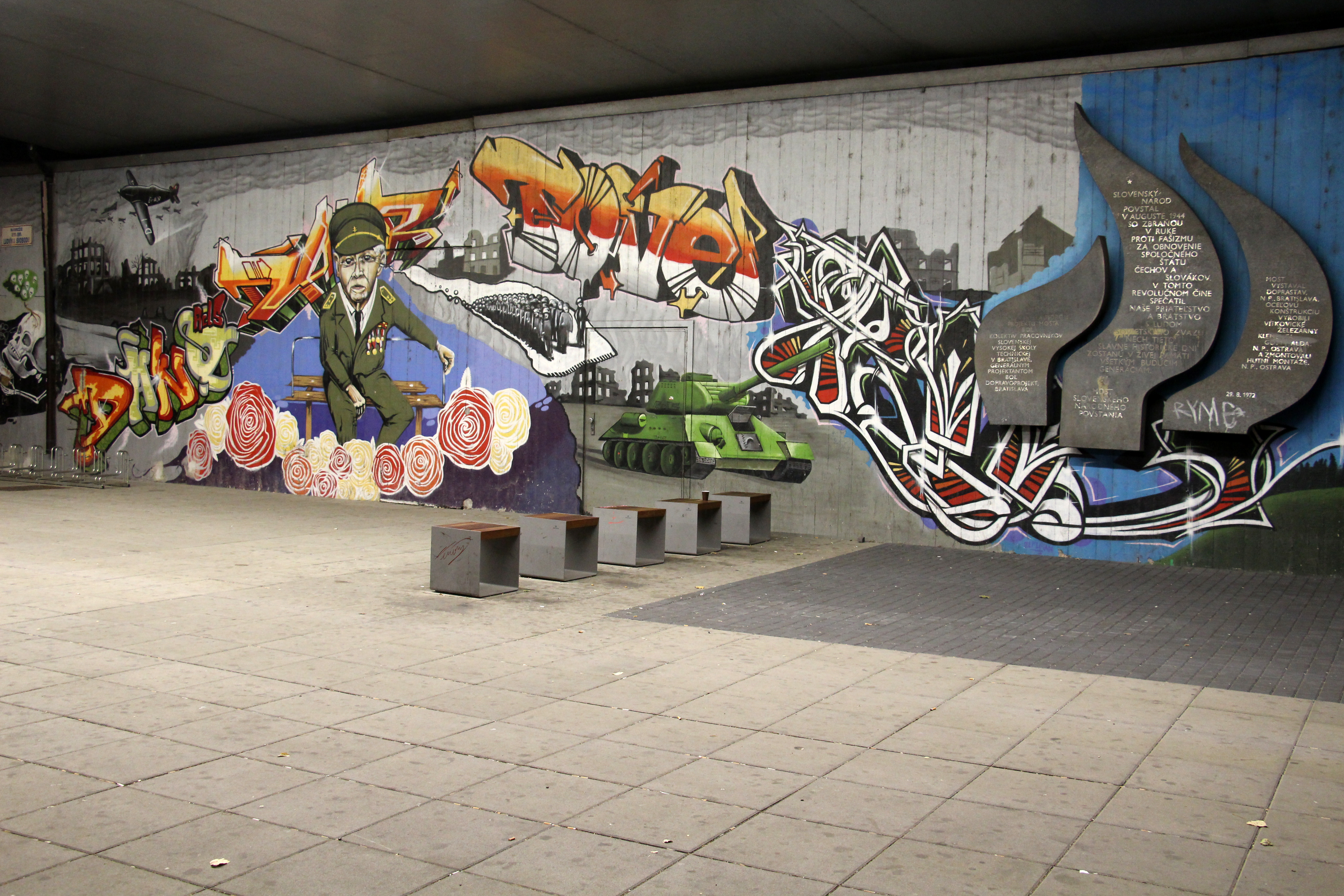
Close-up view of a street art on one of the pillars of the Bridge of the SNP in Bratislava (2018).

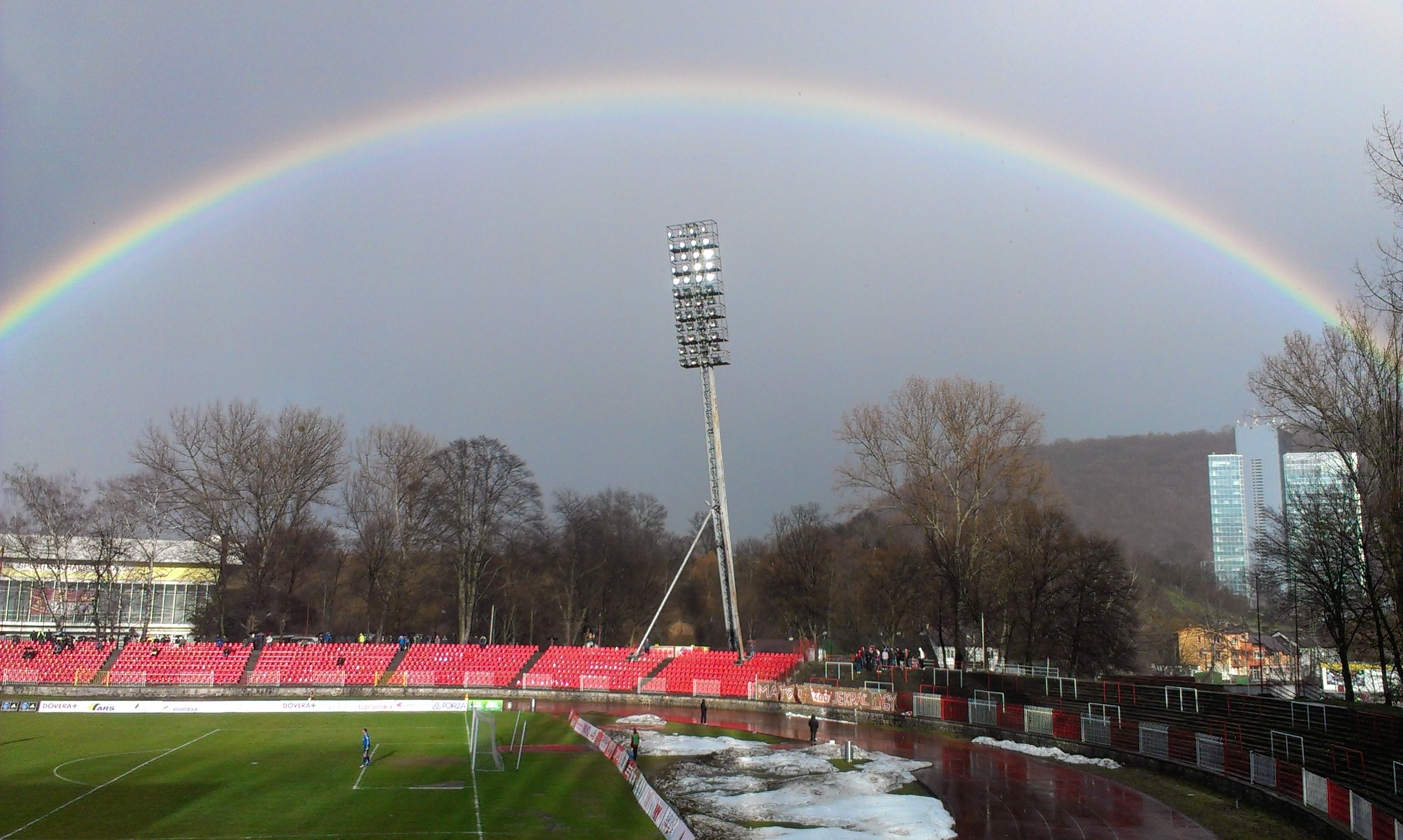
The SNP Stadium in Banská Bystrica

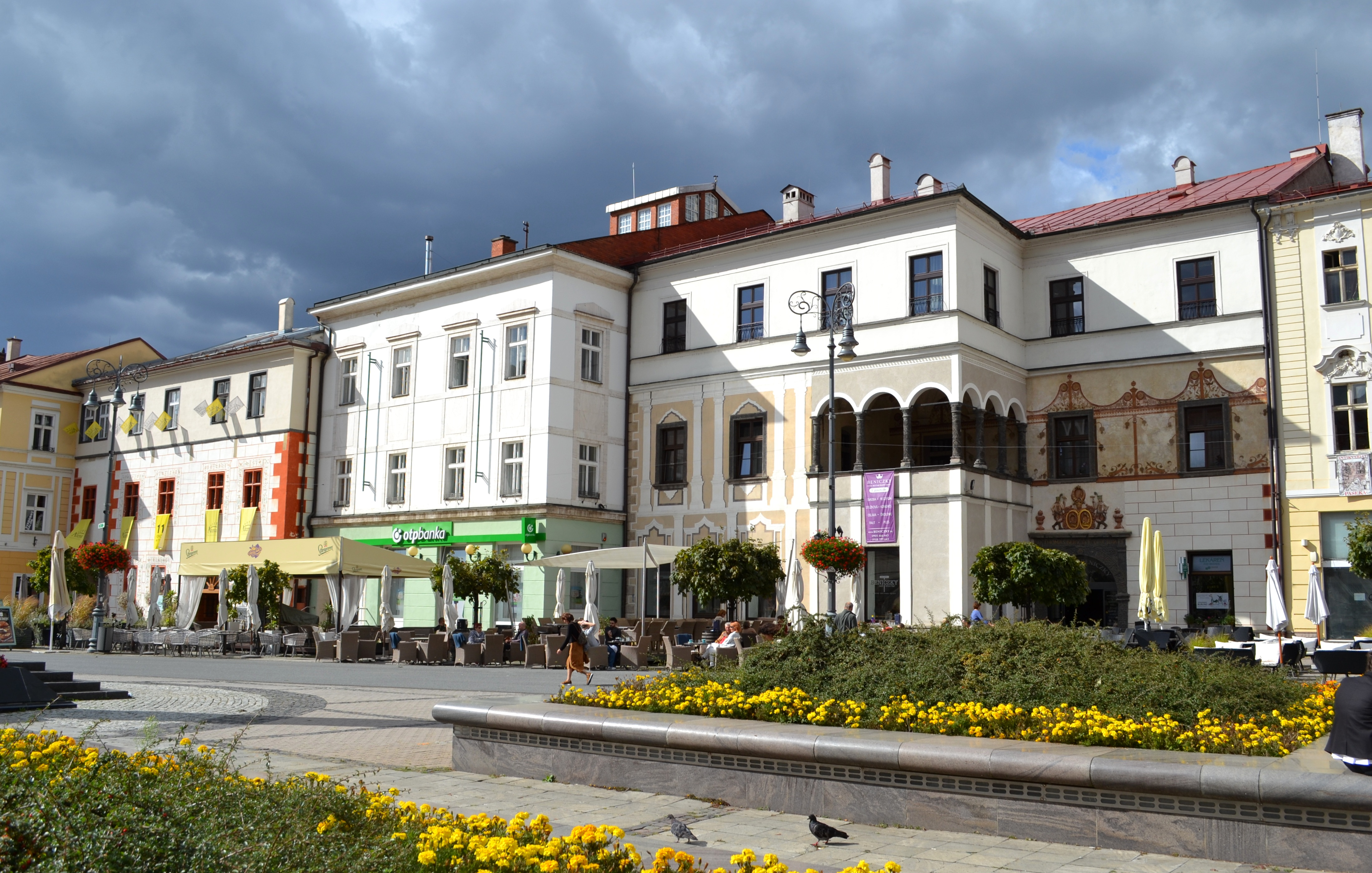
The SNP Square in Banská Bystrica with the SNP Memorial House

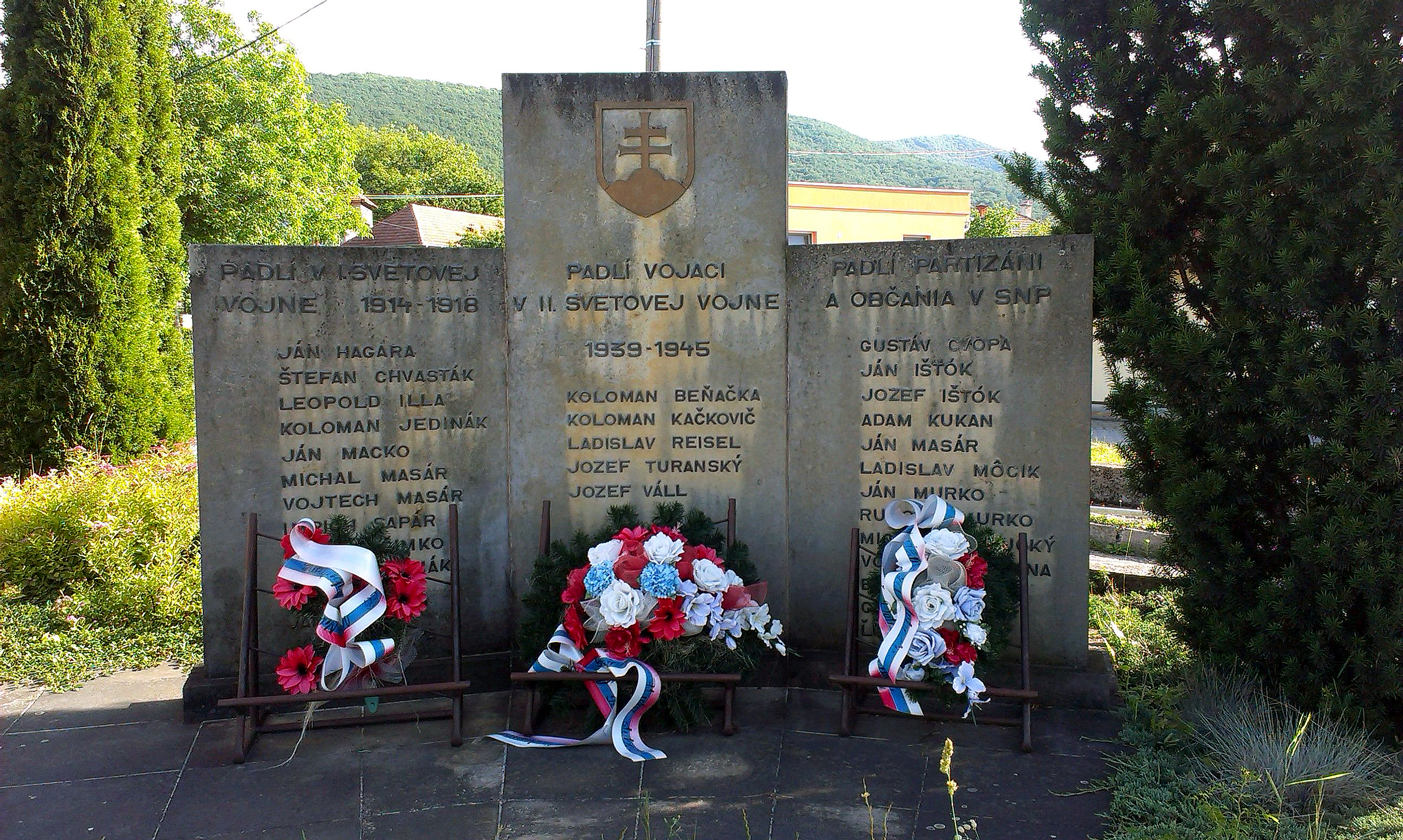
Triple memorial in Dolné Vestenice: Victims of the First World War (left), the Second World War (centre) and the SNP (right)
