= 3rd Brigade =

3rd Brigade may refer to:

== Australia ==
- 3rd Army Tank Brigade (Australia)
- 3rd Brigade (Australia)
- 3rd Light Horse Brigade
- 3rd Motor Brigade (Australia)

== Belarus ==
- 3rd Separate Special-Purpose Brigade

== British India ==
- 3rd (Abbottabad) Brigade
- 3rd (Ambala) Cavalry Brigade
- 3rd (Meerut) Cavalry Brigade
- 3rd Indian Brigade

== Canada ==
- 3rd Canadian Infantry Brigade

== China ==
- 3rd Air Defense Composite Brigade (People's Republic of China)
- 3rd Armored Brigade (People's Republic of China)
- 3rd Motorized Infantry Brigade (People's Republic of China)

== Croatia ==
- 3rd Guards Brigade (Croatia)

== France ==
- 3rd Light Armoured Brigade (France)

== Georgia ==
- 3rd Infantry Brigade (Georgia)

== Germany ==
- 3rd Cavalry Brigade (Germany)
- 3rd Estonian SS Volunteer Brigade
- 3rd Panzer Brigade (Bundeswehr)
- 3rd Panzer Brigade (Wehrmacht)

== Greece ==
- 3rd Greek Mountain Brigade
- 3rd Mechanized Infantry Brigade (Greece)

== India ==
- 3rd (Ambala) Cavalry Brigade
- 3rd (Meerut) Cavalry Brigade
- 3rd Indian Infantry Brigade
- 3rd Indian Motor Brigade

== Iran ==
- 3rd Ansar-ol-Hojjat Brigade
- 3rd Imam Hossein Brigade
- 3rd Marine Brigade (Iran)

== Ireland ==
- 3rd Cork Brigade
- 3rd Tipperary Brigade

== Israel ==
- Alexandroni Brigade

== Italy ==
- 3rd Mechanized Brigade "Goito"
- 3rd Missile Brigade "Aquileia"

== Japan ==
- 3rd Cavalry Brigade (Imperial Japanese Army)

== Lebanon ==
- 3rd Infantry Brigade (Lebanon)

== Lithuania ==
- 3rd Lithuanian National Cavalry Brigade

== Moldova ==
- 3rd Motorized Infantry Brigade "Dacia"

== Poland ==
- 3rd Brigade, Polish Legions
- 3rd Polish Infantry Brigade
- 3rd Mountain Brigade (Poland)

== Russia ==
- 3rd Guards Spetsnaz Brigade

== Serbia ==
- 3rd Army Brigade

== South Africa ==
- 3rd Field Brigade (THA)
- 3rd Infantry Brigade (South Africa)

== South Korea ==
- 3rd Armored Brigade (South Korea)

== Spain ==
- 3rd Mixed Brigade

== Sweden ==
- 3rd Coastal Artillery Brigade

== Turkey ==
- 3rd Commando Brigade (Turkey)

== Ukraine ==
- 3rd Assault Brigade
- 3rd Communication Brigade (Ukraine)
- 3rd Heavy Mechanized Brigade
- 3rd Operational Brigade (Ukraine)
- 3rd Trans-Dnepr Brigade

== United Kingdom ==
- 3rd Anti-Aircraft Brigade (United Kingdom)
- 3rd Armoured Brigade (United Kingdom)
- 3rd Cavalry Brigade (United Kingdom)
- 3 Commando Brigade (United Kingdom)
- 3rd Deep Recce Strike Brigade
- 3rd Guards Brigade (United Kingdom)
- 3rd Infantry Brigade (United Kingdom)
- 3rd Mounted Brigade (United Kingdom)
- 3rd (Nottinghamshire and Derbyshire) Mounted Brigade
- 3rd Parachute Brigade (United Kingdom)
- 3rd Provisional Brigade (United Kingdom)
- 3rd Reserve Brigade
- 3rd (Royal Marine) Brigade

=== Artillery units ===
- 3rd Brigade, Royal Field Artillery
- 3rd Brigade, Cinque Ports Division, Royal Artillery
- 3rd Brigade, Eastern Division, Royal Artillery
- 3rd Brigade, Northern Division, Royal Artillery
- 3rd Brigade, North Irish Division, Royal Artillery
- 3rd Brigade, Scottish Division, Royal Artillery
- 3rd Brigade, Welsh Division, Royal Artillery
- 3rd Brigade, Western Division, Royal Artillery
- 3rd (Duke of Connaught's Own) Brigade, Southern Division, Royal Artillery
- 3rd County of London Brigade Royal Field Artillery
- 3rd East Lancashire Brigade (The Bolton Artillery), Royal Field Artillery
- 3rd Home Counties (Cinque Ports) Brigade, Royal Field Artillery
- 3rd Lowland Brigade, Royal Field Artillery
- 3rd Highland Brigade, Royal Field Artillery
- 3rd (Northumbrian) Medium Brigade, Royal Garrison Artillery
- 3rd Northumbrian (County of Durham) Brigade, Royal Field Artillery
- 3rd North Midland Brigade, Royal Field Artillery
- 3rd South Midland Brigade, Royal Field Artillery
- 3rd Welsh Brigade, Royal Field Artillery
- 3rd Wessex Brigade, Royal Field Artillery
- 3rd West Riding Brigade, Royal Field Artillery
- 3rd Volunteer (Hampshire) Brigade, Southern Division, Royal Artillery
- III Brigade, Royal Horse Artillery
- III Brigade, Royal Horse Artillery (T.F.)

== United States ==
- 3rd Brigade, 7th Infantry Division (United States)
- 3rd Brigade, 24th Infantry Division (United States)
- 3rd Brigade, 104th Division (United States)
- 3rd Chemical Brigade (United States)
- 3rd Infantry Brigade, 2nd Infantry Division
- 3rd Maneuver Enhancement Brigade
- 3rd Marine Expeditionary Brigade
- 3rd Reserve Officers' Training Corps Brigade
- 3rd Security Force Assistance Brigade
- 3rd Signal Brigade (United States)
- 3rd Support Brigade
- 3rd Sustainment Brigade (United States)
- 3rd Transportation Brigade (Expeditionary)

=== Brigade Combat Teams ===
- 3rd Brigade Combat Team, 1st Armored Division
- 3rd Brigade Combat Team, 1st Infantry Division (United States)
- 3rd Brigade Combat Team, 1st Cavalry Division
- 3rd Brigade Combat Team, 2nd Infantry Division (United States)
- 3rd Brigade Combat Team, 10th Mountain Division
- 3rd Brigade Combat Team, 25th Infantry Division (United States)
- 3rd Brigade Combat Team, 82nd Airborne Division
- 3rd Brigade Combat Team, 101st Airborne Division (United States)

== See also ==
- 3rd Division (disambiguation)
- 3rd Regiment (disambiguation)
