= Rudolf Viest =

Slovak military leader (1890–1945)

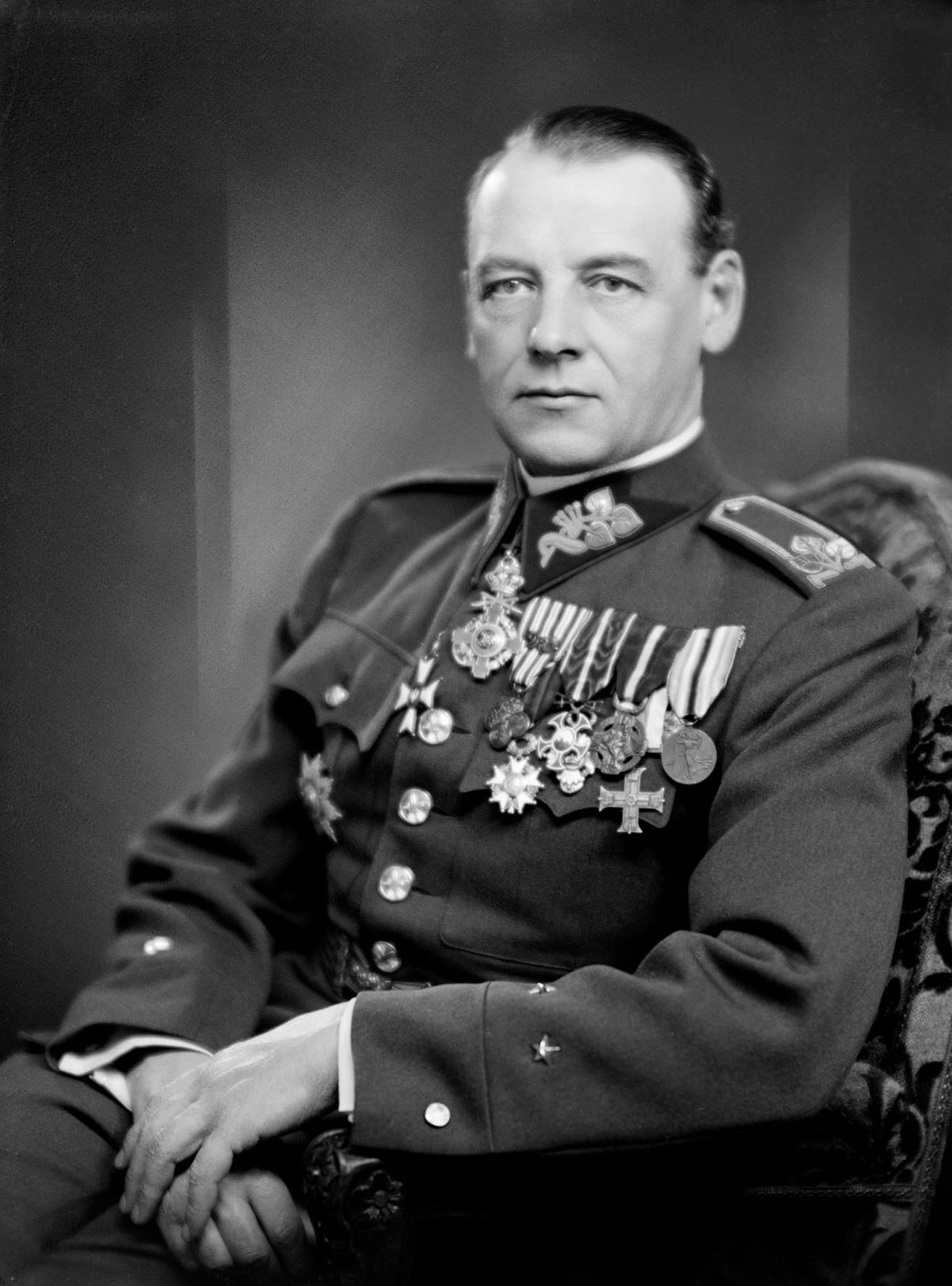
- Born: 24 September 1890; Revúca, Kingdom of Hungary, Austria-Hungary
- Died: 1945 (aged 54–55); Flossenbürg concentration camp, Bavaria, Nazi Germany
- Known for: Second chief commander of the Slovak National Uprising
- Awards: Legion of Honour (1926); Milan Rastislav Stefanik Order, 3rd class (1991, in memoriam); Order of Ľudovít Štúr, 1st Class (1995, in memoriam)

Rudolf Viest (24 September 1890 – 1945) was a Slovak military leader, member of the Czechoslovak government in exile, member of the Slovak National Council and the commander of the 1st Czechoslovak army during the Slovak National Uprising. He was the Slovak with the highest military function and the only Slovak general during the interwar period in the First Czechoslovak Republic.

== Early life and family ==
Viest was born on 24 September 1890 in Revúca, Austria-Hungary. His father Gustáv Viest was a craftsman, later he was an employee of the town office. His mother Jana (born Grnáčová) came from a family of tailors. He had two brothers (Ivan and Dušan) and two sisters (Oľga and Anna). He studied at local primary Lutheran school and later at high school in Revúca. His older brother Ivan studied in Budapest. The whole family moved to Budapest in 1905 after the death of their father. Their household became a place where several nationally conscious people met in time of their studies. He studied building construction and worked briefly for a construction company in Budapest. In October 1911, he joined the army as a volunteer in the 7th infantry regiment in Graz. He finished his military service and became a cadet on 1 September 1912.

== First World War ==
He joined the army again during the general mobilization on 1 August 1914. He started as a squad commander and continued as a company commander from November 1914. He was captured during the Russian offensive near Kraków on 24 November 1914. Because of his strong Slavic feeling, he joined the Serbian army on 1 August 1915, then he fought with Serbian volunteers regiment against Bulgarians. He was injured but after healing he returned to Serbian units. In February 1917, he requested to be assigned to Belgorod to form Czechoslovak legions. From June 1917, he served as a second lieutenant and organized the recruitment of volunteers. In 1919, he became commander of the Czechoslovak camp for Slovaks in Irkutsk. The new Soviet government did not allow legionaries to return home by the shortest way and Viest with others had to fight his way home across Siberia. He returned home through Japan, USA and Canada in 1920.

== Czechoslovakia ==
When he returned to Czechoslovakia, he entered the general staff course and started his professional career as a major. He graduated from the Military Academy in Prague. In the interwar period, he worked on several military and diplomatic positions (military attaché in Hungary and Poland) and intelligence services. In 1933 he was promoted to the position of brigade general and in 1938 to divisional general. He was the first and the only Slovak who reached the position of general in the interwar Czechoslovak Army.

After the Munich Agreement in 1938, he disagreed with the radicalization of the political scene in Slovakia and with negative events like the formation of the Hlinka Guard and seditious anti-Czech propaganda. As a Slovak with the highest position in the army, he was delegated by central government for negotiations with Hungary in Komárno led by the new prime minister of autonomous Slovakia Jozef Tiso. Viest warned him about the negative impacts of radicalization to the security of the state. According to Viest's memoir, general Lev Prchala offered him to perform military cataclysm and take power in November 1938, but Viest considered it too dangerous because formation of borders was not finished yet.

== Slovak Republic ==
Rudolf Viest belonged to a group of anti-Fascist officers and was against the break-up of Czechoslovakia into Slovakia and the protectorate of Bohemia and Moravia. On 14 March 1939, he signed a memorandum against the creation of the Slovak republic delivered to the Slovak Assembly shortly after the declaration of independence. The new regime did not persecute him, but offered him the function of inspector-general of the Slovak Army. He accepted the function after the promise of the minister of defence Ferdinand Čatloš that he would not be in contact with Germans. He was keeping contact with the Czechoslovak government-in-exile in London and he was a member of the resistance movement "Obrana národa" (Defense of Nation). At the same time he contributed a large sum for the economic development of the First Slovak Republic.

Hungary, not being satisfied with territorial gains from the First Vienna Award, attacked Slovakia on 23 March 1939. Viest became a member of the common Slovak-Hungarian commission which was responsible for establishing a new border. According to his memoirs, he finally decided to emigrate during escalation of German-Polish conflict in August 1939. He used for this purpose the official meeting of the commission in Budapest (28 August 1939 - 2 September 1939). He got a visa from the Romanian embassy in Budapest and moved to Bucharest where he obtained a false French passport from the French embassy with the help of his Czechoslovak contact. Due to his function of general inspector he had access to all secret materials, however investigation did not prove that he took any of them. Viest was sentenced to death, degradation to the lowest army position and loss of state citizenship on 28 March 1942. (Note: As in other cases, Slovak military courts sentenced to death mostly when deserters were already in safety. His family relatives were not persecuted and his brother Ivan preserved a high position in the Ministry of Transportation.)

== Exile ==
On 13 September, he arrived in Paris. He became a member of the Czechoslovak national committee and commander of the Czechoslovak army in exile. From 1 January 1940, he was commander of the Czechoslovak Army Ground Forces, later transformed to the 1st Czechoslovak Division in France. After the Nazi occupation of France in June 1940, he moved to Britain and joined Edvard Beneš on 10 July. On 10 October 1940, he became a member of the Council of State and minister on 27 October 1940. On 8 May 1940, he became deputy of minister of national defence in the Czechoslovak government-in-exile.

== Slovak National Uprising ==
On 8 May 1944, Czechoslovak representatives signed an agreement with the Soviet Union which guaranteed the Soviets would pass the administration of liberated territory to the exiled government in London. Rudolf Viest became the deputy delegate for liberated territory responsible for this task, and in August 1944 travelled with the Czechoslovak delegation to the Soviet Union. After the start of the Slovak National Uprising on 29 August 1944, Ján Golian became the commander of the 1st Czechoslovak Army in Slovakia and urged the government-in-exile to send Viest to support the uprising. Viest returned to Slovakia during the night of 6-7 October 1944 to take official command of the uprising, and was made a member of the Slovak National Council on 13 October. By the time Viest arrived to take command, achieving the original goals of the uprising was already likely unrealistic given internal infighting. On 18 October 1944, the German Army started a general offensive focused on eliminating resistance in the Slovak territory held by the resistance. As the situation collapsed, Viest issued a final order from Donovaly during the night of 27–28 October for his forces to switch to guerrilla warfare. (Note: "Boj za slobodu Československa sa nekončí, bude pokračovať v horách" (The struggle for the freedom of Czechoslovakia doesn't end, it will continue in the mountains)) This order had only symbolic value, since the army as an organized unit had already ceased to exist, and the order could not be delivered to all troops due to disrupted communication lines.

Viest tried to escape from German encirclement and reach the Red Army. On 3 November 1944, he was captured with Golian in Pohronský Bukovec. They were taken first to Banská Bystrica and then to Bratislava. On 10 November, they were transported to Vienna on Himmler's order, and then taken to Berlin. There they were interrogated by the SS-Reichssicherheitshauptamt in a prison on Prinz-Albert-Straße, but were treated decently. During the entire period Viest continued to declare support for the restoration of Czechoslovakia and democracy. Information about his last days is unclear. Viest probably died with other Slovak generals (Augustín Malár, Ján Golian and Štefan Jurech) in the Flossenbürg concentration camp sometime in 1945. While the camp remained in operation until April 1945, records covering the possible execution of the Slovak generals are missing. It is also possible that Viest and other Slovak generals survived the war, yet died later after being transferred to the Soviet Union.

After his death, he was honoured in memoriam with the Order of Slovak National Uprising 1st class (1945), the Czechoslovak Military Cross (1945), and many other honours awarded by Czechoslovakia and other countries, listed below. In 1945, Viest was also promoted posthumously to the rank of General in the Czechoslovak Army.

== Honours ==
=== Czechoslovak ===
- Order of the Falcon with Swords 1918–1920
- Czechoslovak War Cross 1918
- Czechoslovak Victory Medal (1922)
- St. Wenceslas Medal
- Order of the Slovak National Uprising 1st class in memoriam (1945)
- Order of the Red Banner in memoriam
- Czechoslovak Revolutionary Medal
- Silver Medal 1st class for services to Czechoslovakia
- Czechoslovak Medal for Services to Czechoslovakia 1st class (1944)
- Czechoslovak War Cross 1939 in memoriam (1945)
- Milan Rastislav Štefánik Order 3rd class in memoriam (1991)
- Memorial Badge and Medal of Štefánik 3rd class

=== Foreign ===
- (Slovakia) Order of Ľudovít Štúr, 1st Class, military in memoriam (1995)
- (Czech Republic) Cross of State Defense in memoriam (1995)
- (Poland) Order of Polonia Restituta (1941, 1943)
- (Socialist Federal Republic of Yugoslavia) Order of the Yugoslav Crown
- (Serbia) Order of Miloš the Great
- (Serbia) Military Cross
- (France) Legion of Honour (1926)
- (France) Croix de Guerre
- (United Kingdom) Military Cross
