= 3rd Mountain Brigade =

3rd Mountain Brigade may refer to:

- 3rd Greek Mountain Brigade
- 3rd Mountain Brigade (Poland)
- 3rd Brigade Combat Team, 10th Mountain Division

== See also ==
- 3rd Brigade (disambiguation)
- 3rd Infantry Brigade (disambiguation)
