= First Czechoslovak Army in Slovakia =

Military unit

flag of Czechoslovakia

The First Czechoslovak Army in Slovakia was an ad-hoc military formation formed by the insurgents of the Slovak National Uprising (August – October 1944) against Nazi Germany. It was destroyed by German and pro-German Slovak forces as part of the successful crackdown against the Slovak National Uprising.

== Background ==
The First Slovak Republic had been formed as a puppet state of Nazi Germany in early 1939, during the German Invasion of Czechoslovakia, when the territories of the modern-day Czech Republic that had not yet been part of Nazi Germany as a result of the 1938 Munich Agreement were forcefully integrated into the Protectorate of Bohemia and Moravia ("Reich Protectorate" for short). Slovakia agreed in treaties with Germany signed on 23 March 1939 to follow the German lead in foreign policy, and later to also allow the formation of a German Zone of Protection in Slovakia, where German forces in the country were initially concentrated. Militarily, Slovakia was forced to fight a brief war against Germany's partner Hungary; the Slovak–Hungarian War ended in further territorial concessions to Hungary that even exceeded the previous concessions made at the First Vienna Award of 2 November 1938.

Slovakia participated in World War II on the side of the Axis; the Slovak Field Army Bernolák participated in the German Invasion of Poland of September 1939 with a small-scale Slovak invasion of Poland. On 23 June 1941, the Slovak Republic declared war on the Soviet Union, which had been invaded by Germany a day prior; a Slovak contingent subsequently was placed under the command of the German 17th Army.

As the fortune of war on the Eastern Front turned against the Axis, Slovak soldiers began to desert in disproportionate numbers to the Red Army, especially after the widely acclaimed German defeat at the Battle of Stalingrad 1942/43. The actions of Soviet partisans in areas still occupied by Germany and its allies widened to include Slovakia as well starting in spring of 1944. The anti-German partisans started to infiltrate central Slovakia in August 1944, and the Bratislava government soon lost control in the area, declaring martial law on 10 August 1944. As even Slovak military officers were starting to defect to the underground Slovak National Council, the German chief diplomat in Bratislava Hanns Ludin suggested to his government a German occupation of Slovakia. On 28 August, the German government gave corresponding orders and received a token permission by Jozef Tiso, the puppet president of Slovakia. Warnings were given out within the military resistance, and the Slovak National Uprising began on 29 August 1944, the same day as German troops moved to occupy the whole of Slovakia.

== Operational history ==
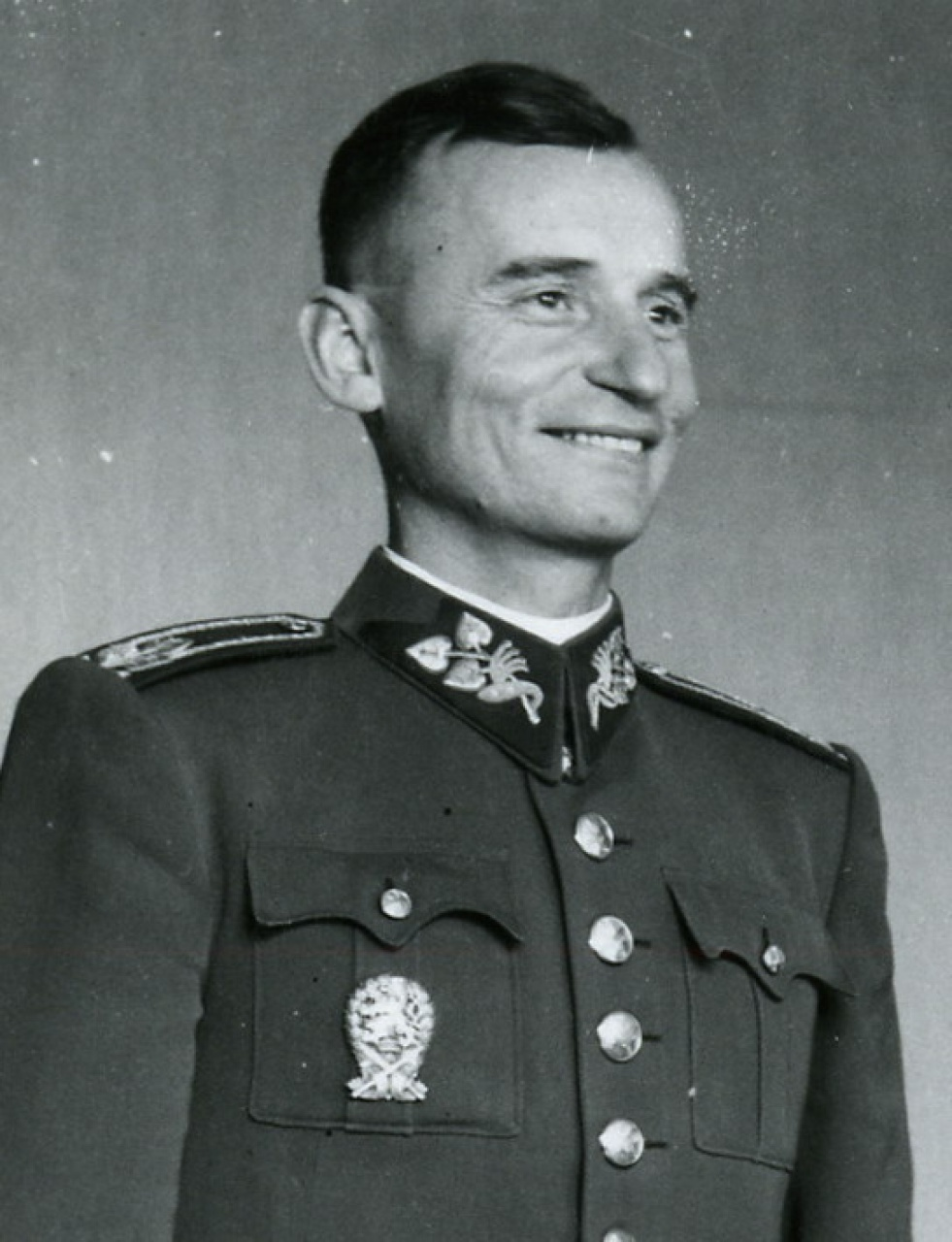
Ján Golian

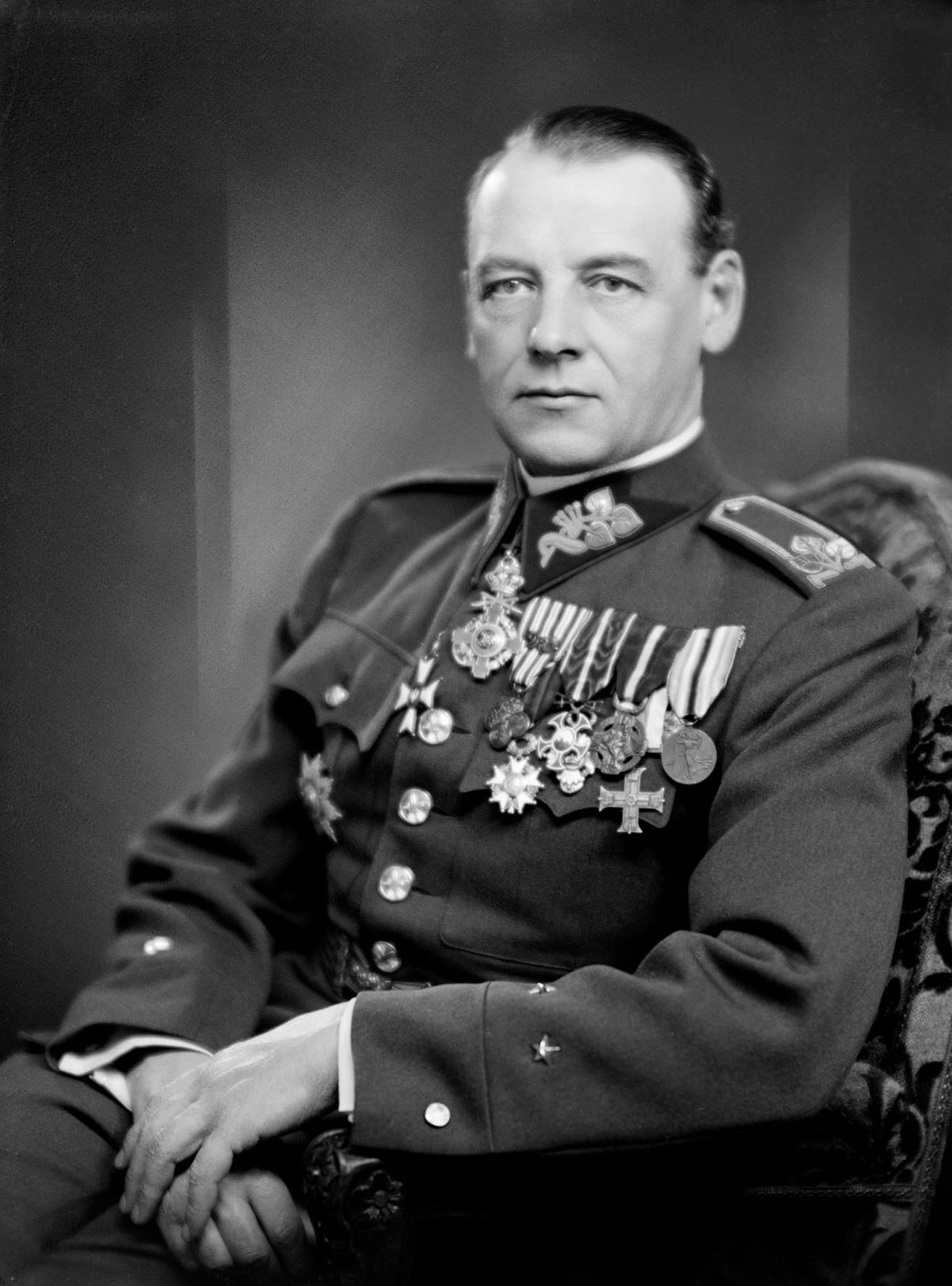
Rudolf Viest

Initially under command of Ján Golian, who was later succeeded by Rudolf Viest, the First Czechoslovak Army in Slovakia, which was formed in early October 1944, fought against better-armed German forces and pro-German Slovak formations until 27 October 1944, when Banská Bystrica, where the insurgents had their power base, fell to the Germans. Viest had returned from exile in London to take his command. In late September, the 2nd Independent Czechoslovak Airborne Brigade and the 1st Independent Czechoslovak Fighter Regiment joined the fight.

In a protracted defensive battle, the Slovaks came under increasing pressure in mid-October 1944; a major German offensive of 18–20 October brought the military decision by enabling the capture of Banská Bystrica on the 27th.

After the Slovak National Uprising was crushed, the First Czechoslovak Army in Slovakia operationally ceased to exist; surviving veterans and remnant groups retreated into Slovakia's mountains, from where they waged guerilla warfare against the Germans until the end of the war in early 1945.

== Legacy ==
Memorials to the members of the Slovak National Uprising include the memorial to the 2nd Independent Czechoslovak Airborne Brigade in Nowosielce in Poland.

== See also ==
- Slovak Resistance Air Force
- 1st Czechoslovak Army Corps in the Soviet Union of the Soviet Red Army
  - 1st Czechoslovak Mixed Air Division, the air wing of the Czechoslovak forces in the Red Army
- 1st Czechoslovak Independent Armoured Brigade, part of the Western Allied invasion force of 1944–45
