= 2nd Mountain Brigade (Poland) =

WW2 Polish Army unit

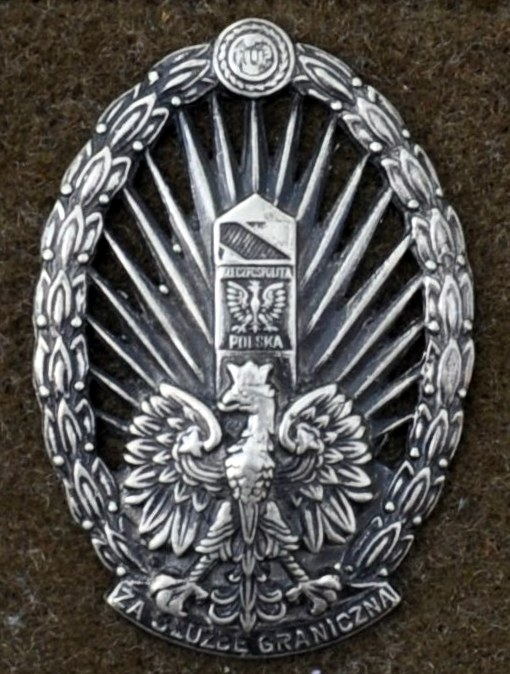
- Active: 10 July 1939 – 27 September 1939
- Country: Poland
- Branch: Carpathian Army
- Role: Mountain Infantry
- Engagements: World War II: Invasion of Poland; Slovak invasion of Poland

Commanders
- Notable commanders: Colonel Aleksander Stawarz

2nd Mountain Brigade (Polish: 2. Brygada Gorska) was a unit of the Polish Army, which took part in the Polish September Campaign. Commanded by Colonel Aleksander Stawarz, it was part of Operational Group "Jasło" of Army Karpaty. Its purpose was to defend an 80-kilometer section of Polish-Slovak border, from Czorsztyn to the Beskid Mountain Pass. Facing the Poles to the south, in Slovakia, were two German Mountain Divisions and one Slovak division, which would attack north, along valleys of the Dunajec and the Biała rivers.

In the morning of 1 September 1939, 2nd Mountain Brigade was attacked both by the Slovaks (in the area of Mniszek) and the Wehrmacht (in the area of Spisz). Slovak units did not succeed, but the Germans managed to capture such towns as Zakopane, Czorsztyn and Szczawnica. Thus, the brigade was forced to retreat north, fighting continuously along the way.

In the morning of 5 September, units of the brigade were located in Nowy Sącz. The 2. battalion, led by major Miłek, withdrew on 5 September to the elevated advantageous positions, but against the orders. Also, against the gist of the orders, the second battalion did not blow the bridges. Soon afterwards, the Germans, taking advantage of the situation, captured Nowy Sącz, together with bridges, which Polish troops had not destroyed in time. The brigade withdrew to Gorlice and on 8 September - to Krosno. On 8 September, in Krosno, the tired soldiers did not post sufficient sentries, and the German motorized troops suddenly entered the city, capturing about half of PFC's and officers. Thus, the brigade ceased to exist; its remnants withdrew towards Brzozów and Bircza, fighting several skirmishes with advancing Wehrmacht. One regiment did continue to fight until September 24, when over the period of 4 days, the regiment successfully sneaked into Hungary by 27 September 1939.

== See also ==
- Polish army order of battle in 1939
- Polish contribution to World War II
