= Bernolák =

Bernolák may refer to:

- 13916 Bernolák, main belt asteroid with an orbital period of 1388
- Anton Bernolák (1762–1813), Slovak linguist, Catholic priest and author of the first Slovak language standard
- Anton Bernolák's Chapel, in Nové Zámky, Slovakia, built in 1722 in the baroque style
- Field Army Bernolák, infantry unit during World War II in Jozef Tiso's Axis World War II Slovakia
