= 3rd Motor Brigade =

3rd Motor Brigade or 3rd Motorized Infantry Brigade or may refer to:

- 3rd Indian Motor Brigade
- 3rd Motor Brigade (Australia)
- 3rd Motorized Infantry Brigade "Dacia"
- 3rd Motorized Infantry Brigade (People's Republic of China)

== See also ==
- 3rd Brigade (disambiguation)
- 3rd Infantry Brigade (disambiguation)
