= Slovak invasion of Poland =

1939 World War II invasion

- Part of Invasion of Poland of World War II
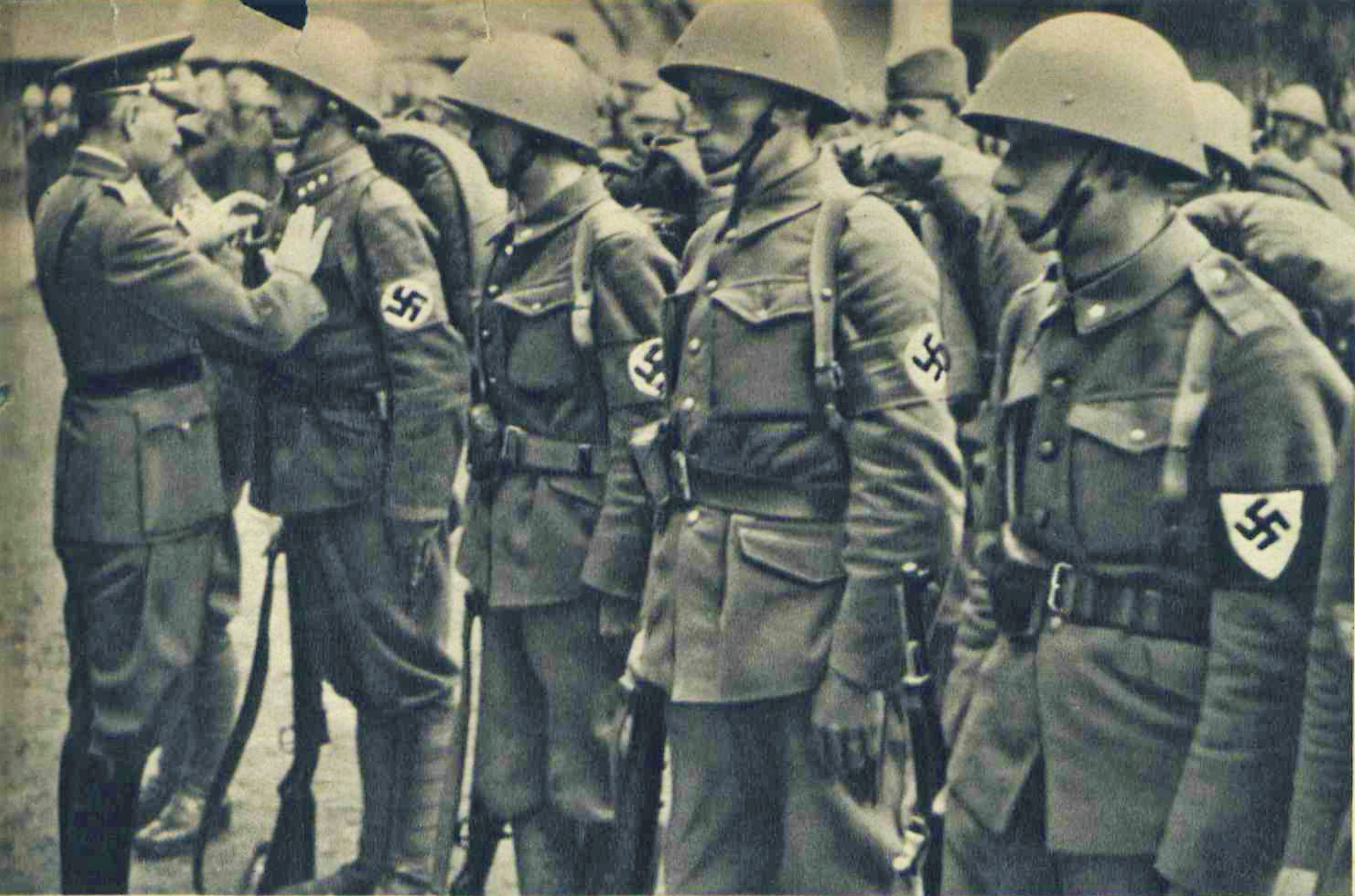
- Slovak Minister of Defence Ferdinand Čatloš decorates ethnic Germans in the Slovak Army
Date	1–16 September 1939
Location	Kraków Voivodeship, Poland
Result	Slovak victory
Territorial changes	Slovakia annexes the disputed territories

Belligerents
Slovakia; Supported by: Germany	Poland

Commanders and leaders
Ferdinand Čatloš	Kazimierz Fabrycy

Units involved
Field Army Bernolák; Supported by: 14th Army	Carpathian Army

Strength
3 infantry divisions (main) with nearby German units in support	6 infantry divisions

Casualties and losses
37 killed; 114 wounded; 11 missing; 2 aircraft destroyed	Unknown killed; 1,350 POWs; 1 aircraft shot down

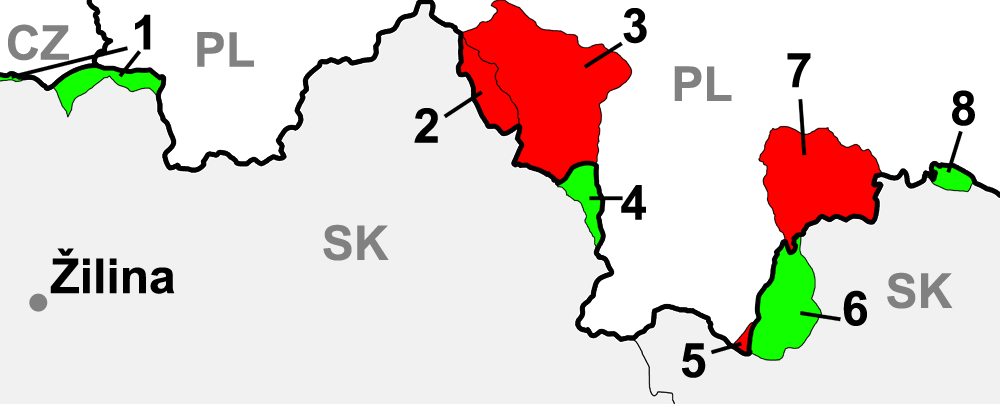
Disputed border areas with Poland. In 1920, red areas were given to Poland and green areas to Czechoslovakia.

The Slovak invasion of Poland occurred during Nazi Germany's invasion of Poland in September 1939. The recently created Slovak Republic joined the attack, and Field Army Bernolák contributed over 50,000 soldiers in three divisions. Since most of the Polish forces were engaged with the German armies, which were more to the north of the southern border, the Slovak invasion met only weak resistance and suffered minimal losses.

== Background ==
On March 14, 1939, the Slovak State was established as a client state of Germany, which initiated the breakup of Czechoslovakia. The southern Slovak part of Czechoslovakia had contained a substantial Hungarian population (Slovakia had been part of the Kingdom of Hungary). It was taken by the Royal Hungarian Army as a result of the First Vienna Award on November 2, 1938.

The official political pretext for the Slovak participation in the Polish Campaign was a small disputed area on the Poland–Slovakia border. Poland had appropriated the area on October 1, 1938, after the previous month's Munich Agreement. In addition, some Polish politicians supported Hungary in its effort to include areas that were inhabited mostly by Hungarians.

During secret discussions with the Germans on July 20–21, 1939, the Slovak government agreed to participate in Germany's planned attack on Poland and to allow Germany to use Slovak territory as the staging area for German troops. On August 26, Slovakia mobilised its armed forces and established a new field army, codenamed "Bernolák", with 51,306 soldiers. Additionally, 160,000 reservists were called up, with 115,000 entering service until September 20, 1939.

== Order of battle ==
The Bernolák army group was led by Slovak Defence Minister Ferdinand Čatloš and had its initial headquarters in Spišská Nová Ves, though after September 8 this was moved to Solivar near Prešov. It consisted of:

- 1st Infantry Division "Jánošík", led by Anton Pulanich in the sector Spišská Nová Ves – Prešov.
- 2nd Infantry Division "Škultéty", led by Alexander Čunderlík in the sector Brezno – Poprad.
- 3rd Infantry Division "Rázus", led by Augustín Malár in the sector east of High Tatra.
- A motorized unit "Kalinčiak" was created on September 5, but the campaign ended before it had arrived at the front.

The group was part of the German Army Group South; was subordinated to the 14th Army, led by Wilhelm List; and contributed to the 14th Army's total of five infantry divisions, three mountain divisions, two panzer divisions and one Luftwaffe division. Bernolák's tasks were to prevent a Polish incursion into Slovakia and to support German troops.

They were opposed by the Polish Carpathian Army, which consisted mainly of infantry units with some light artillery support and no tanks.

== Campaign ==
The attack started without a formal declaration of war on September 1, 1939, at 5:00 a.m. The 1st division occupied the village of Javorina and the town of Zakopane and continued toward Nowy Targ to protect the German 2nd Mountain Division from the left. On September 4 and 5, it engaged in fighting with regular Polish Army units. On September 7, the division stopped its advance 30 km inside Polish territory. Later, the division was pulled back, with one battalion remaining until September 29 to occupy Zakopane, Jurgów and Javorina.

The 2nd Division was kept in reserve and participated only in mopping-up operations in which was supported by the Kalinčiak group. The 3rd Division had to protect 170 km of the Slovak border between Stará Ľubovňa and the border with Hungary. It fought minor skirmishes, and after several days, it moved into Polish territory and ended its advance on September 11.

Two or three Slovak air squadrons (codenamed Ľalia, Lily) were used for reconnaissance, close support for German bombers. Two Slovak Avia B.534 planes were lost (one to anti-aircraft fire, another to an accidental crash), and one Polish plane was shot down. The total Slovak losses during the campaign were 37 dead, 114 wounded and 11 missing. Polish losses are unknown but thought to be greater than that of Slovakia.

== Aftermath ==
All Slovak units were pulled back until the end of September 1939. On October 5, a victorious military parade was held in Poprad. The mobilised units were gradually demobilised, and the Army Group Bernolák was disbanded on October 7.

The Slovak Army took around 1,350 civilian prisoners in Poland. In February 1940, around 1,200 of them were handed to Germans and some of the remainders to the Soviets. The rest were kept in a Slovak prison camp in Lešť.

All of the disputed territory, whether in Poland from 1920 or only from 1938, was given to Slovakia, which was confirmed by a Slovak parliamentary resolution on December 22, 1939. That arrangement lasted until 20 May 1945, when the border line was returned to its 1920 position. Since the war was started without a formal declaration of war and there were no longer any Polish prisoners of war held by Slovakia, there was no formal peace treaty between Poland and Slovakia.

== Gallery ==
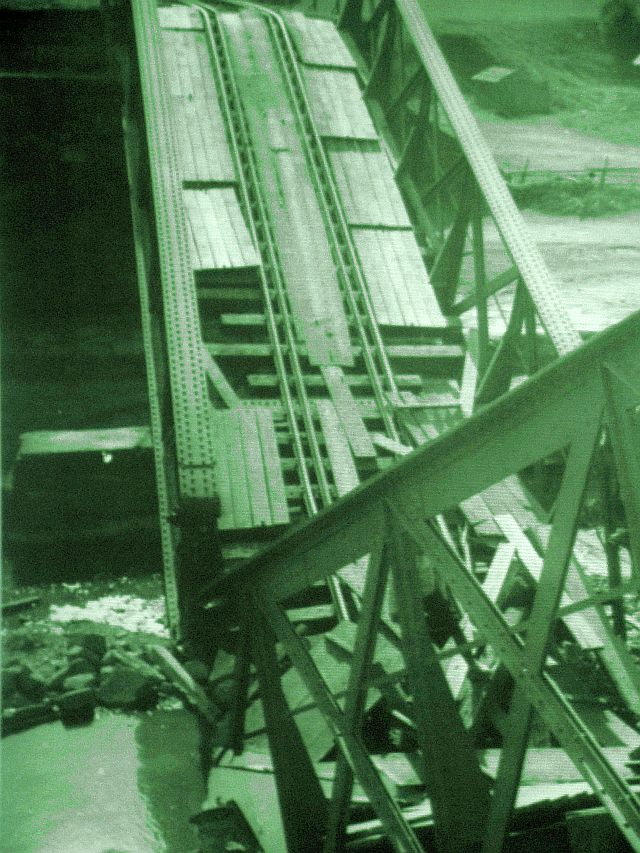
Komańcza, Poland, in 1939

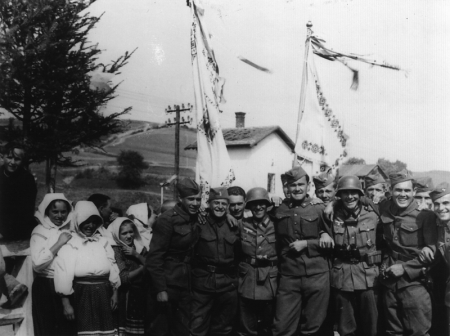
Cheerful German and Slovak soldiers posing with Ukrainian civilians in Komańcza, Poland, in 1939

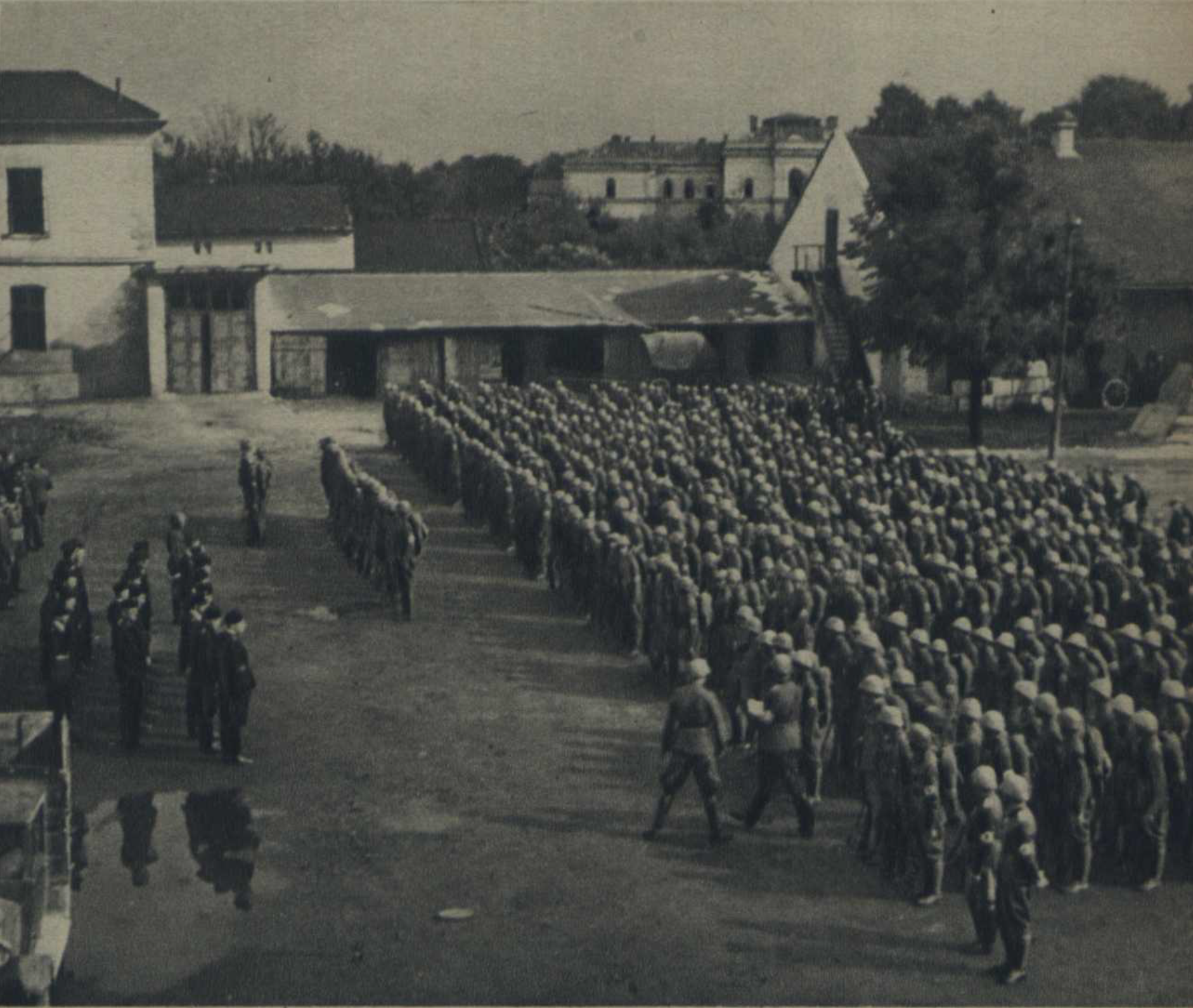

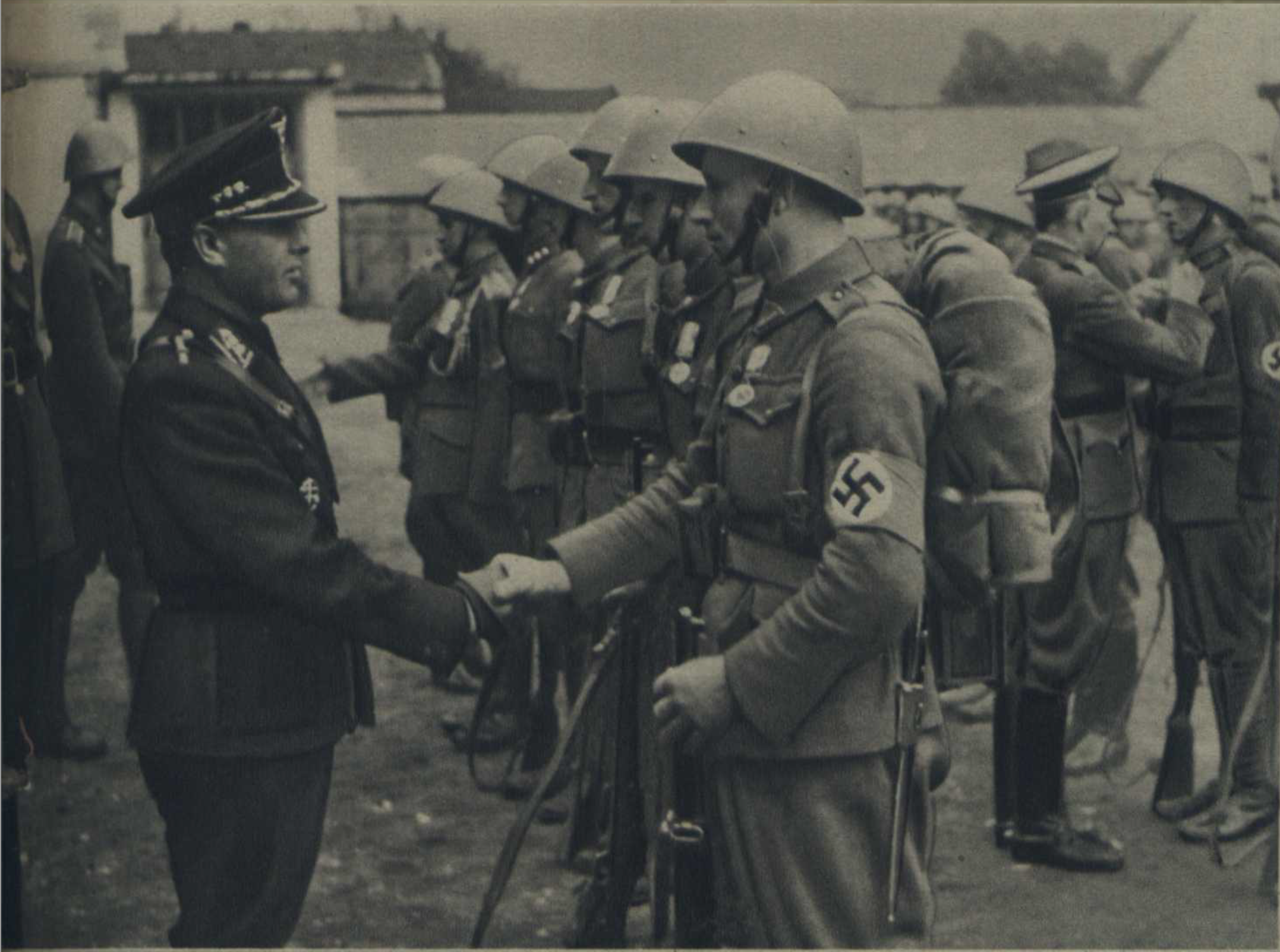

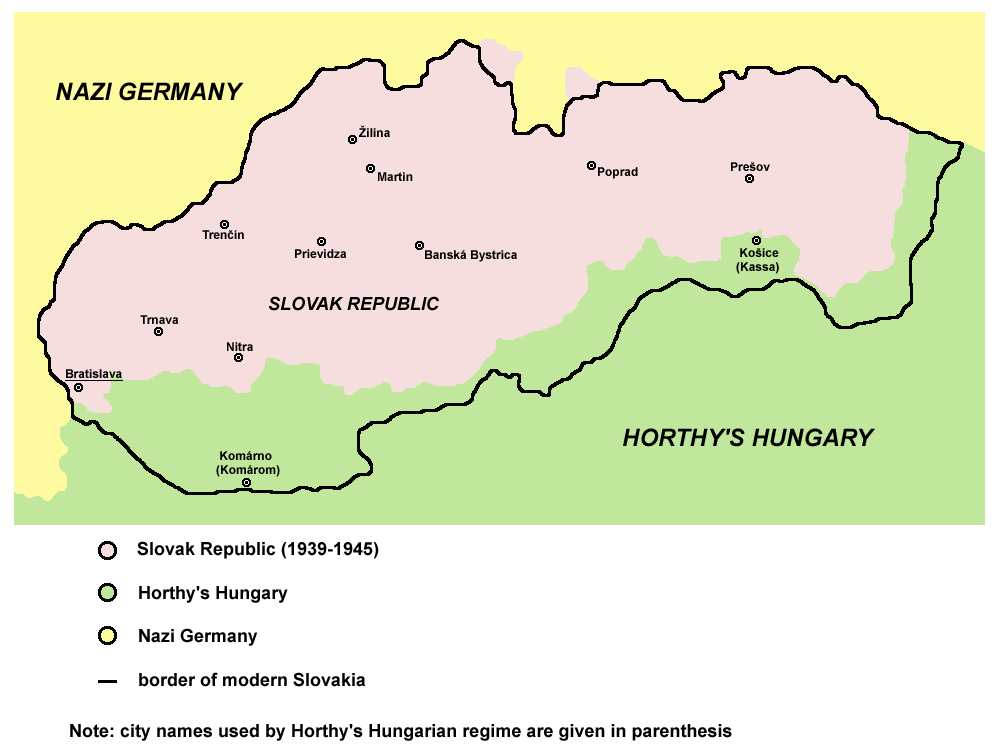
The Slovak Republic after the campaign

== See also ==
- Carpathian Army
- Field Army Bernolák
- List of Czechoslovakia interwar period weapons-Slovak arsenal was those weapons inherited from Czechoslovakia.
- Slovak Air Force (1939–1945)
- List of World War II military equipment of Poland
- List of German military equipment of World War II
