= Aleksander Stawarz =

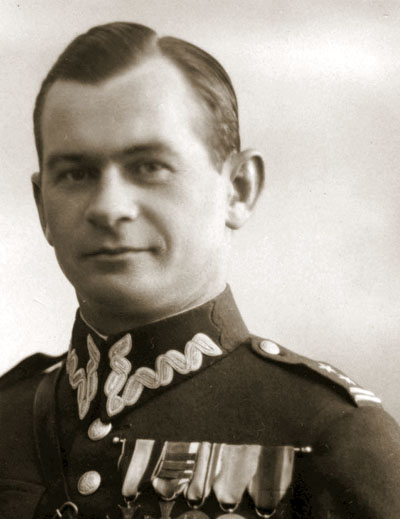
Aleksander Stawarz

Aleksander Stawarz codename: Leśnik, Baca (7 August 1896, Nowy Targ - 28 January 1941, Auschwitz) was a Polish Army Colonel.

In the First World War Stawarz served in Polish Legions. Since 1918 in the Polish Army he took part in the Polish-Bolshevik war, he distinguished himself during street fights in Minsk and the battle of Kalinówka.

During the Second World War Stawarz was commander of the "2nd Highland Brigade" of the Army Karpaty. From 1939 until 1941 he was the founder and commander of the resistance unit "Dywizja Podhalańska", which was part of the ZWZ.

He was arrested by the Gestapo and murdered in the German concentration camp Auschwitz.
