= Carpathian Half-Brigade of National Defence =

Interwar Polish Army unit

Carpathian Half-Brigade of National Defence (Polish: Karpacka Półbrygada Obrony Narodowej) was a unit of the Polish Army in the interbellum period that took part in the Polish September Campaign. It was formed in July 1937 in Stanisławów. Originally, it consisted of two battalions, but in May 1939 it was expanded to four battalions. In the summer of 1939 it became part of the Karpaty Army. Its battalions were:

- Battalion Stryj,
- Battalion Stanislawow,
- Battalion Huculski I,
- Battalion Huculski II.

== Sources ==
- September Campaign, Karpaty Army
- Brigades of National Defence

== See also ==
- Polish army order of battle in 1939
- Polish September Campaign
