= Ferdinand Čatloš =

Slovak minister of defence of the Slovakia and general (1895–1972)

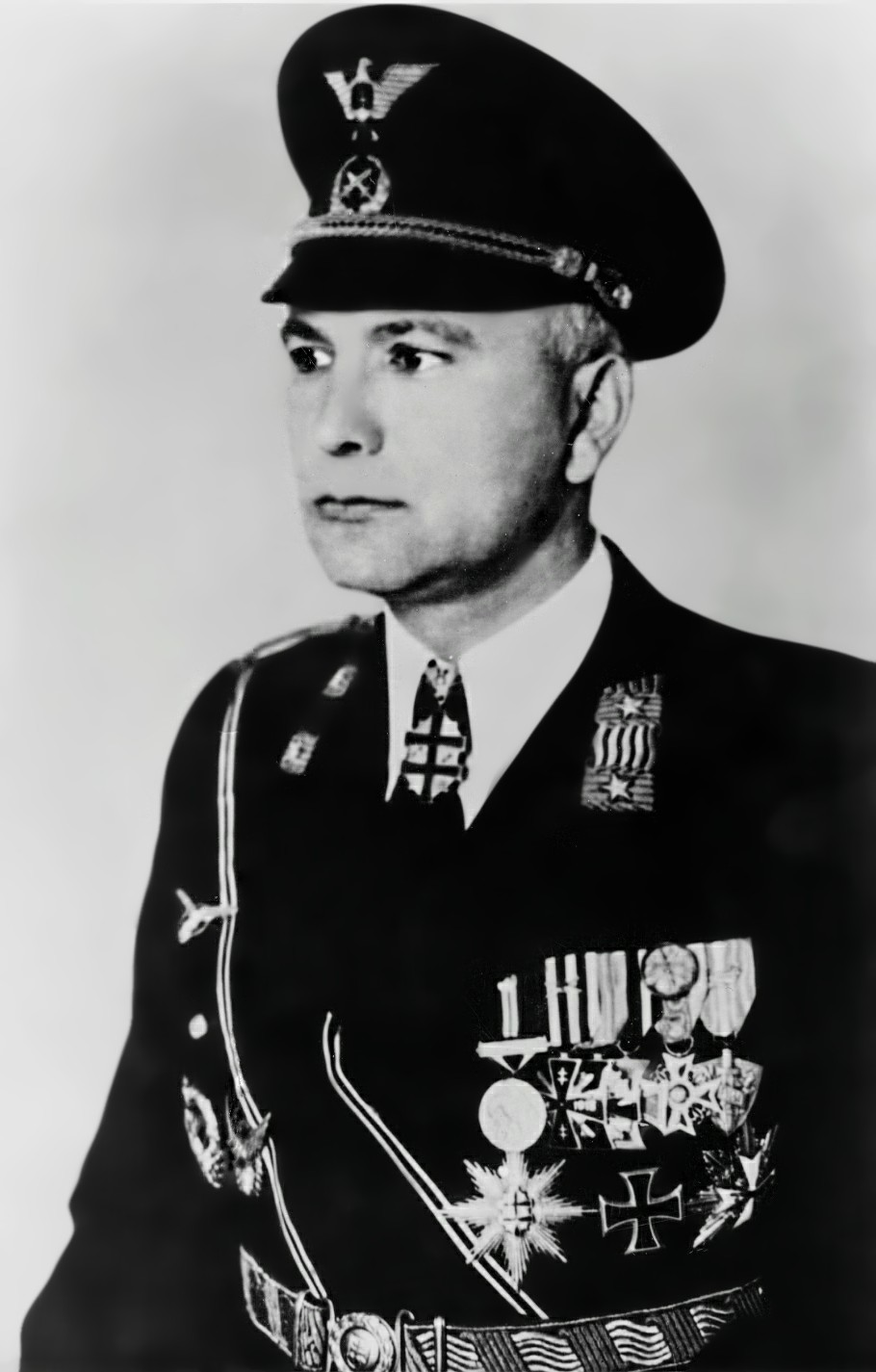
- Born: October 7, 1895; Szentpéter, Austria-Hungary (now Liptovský Peter, Slovakia)
- Died: August 31, 1972 (aged 76); Martin, Czechoslovakia, (now Martin, Slovakia)
- Military career
- Allegiance: Slovakia (1939–1945)
- Branch: Slovak Army
- Rank: General 1st Class (Lieutenant General)
- Commands: Field Army Bernolák
- Conflicts: World War II; Invasion of Poland

Ferdinand Čatloš (October 7, 1895 – August 31, 1972), born Csatlós Nándor, was a Slovak military officer and politician. Throughout his short career in the administration of the Slovak Republic he held the post of Minister of Defence. He was also the commanding officer of the Field Army Bernolák during the 15-day Slovak invasion of Poland. As a Minister of Defence of the fascist Slovak state, he played a significant, although a dubious, part in the organization of the Slovak National Uprising in 1944.

On September 1, 1939, the Slovak Republic attacked Poland with three infantry divisions under his general command. They only met weak resistance, quickly overran the Polish forces and occupied parts of the Polish territory. The Slovak forces suffered relatively minor losses, with 37 killed, 114 wounded, 11 missing and 2 aircraft shot down.

At the beginning of 1944, together with General Augustín Malár, he developed a plan for a military coup in Slovakia, known as the Čatloš Memorandum.

Under the pretext of preparations for fortification work, the best-armed "Malár" East Slovak Army (1st and 2nd Infantry Division) was strengthened, which, according to his plan, was to open the Carpathian passes to the Soviet troops. The plan also envisaged that the Field Army in Slovakia would carry out a coup d'état against the Nazi-controlled Slovak government, and establish a military dictatorship, which would control the state until the free elections could be held. The 2nd Technical Division would occupy south-western region of Slovakia "Žitný ostrov" after withdrawing from Italy.

He tried to establish contact with the Soviet military authorities and the domestic resistance. On August 4, 1944, he sent the memorandum to the USSR in his own aircraft, which he provided to the delegation of the Slovak National Council. However, member of the delegation Lieutenant Colonel Mikuláš Ferjenčík did not meet with Moscow-based General Heliodor Píka, who was under the command of the Czechoslovak exile government based in London, until September 2, 1944, when the Uprising was already in full swing.

On August 29, 1944, he was detained and placed in "honorary custody" in the palace of President Jozef Tiso. Even before Lt. Col. Ján Golian's speech with a call for military resistance against the occupiers, which was broadcast via public radio broadcasting service in Banská Bystrica, General Čatloš announced in his speech (conceived by Slovak fascist propagandist Tido J. Gašpar) in the Bratislava radio the arrival of German occupation troops in Slovakia and called on the Slovak army not to resist.

Four days after the outbreak of the Slovak National Uprising, on September 2, 1944, he managed to escape from the presidential palace to Banská Bystrica, where he put himself at the disposal of the insurgents. His services were refused. He was finally detained and transported to the USSR on September 13, 1944.

At the conclusion of World War II, he was imprisoned for five years by the National Court of Bratislava and released in 1948. He spent the remainder of his life working as an ordinary clerk in Martin, Czechoslovakia. He then died in 1972.
