= Ján Golian =

Slovak general (1906–1945)

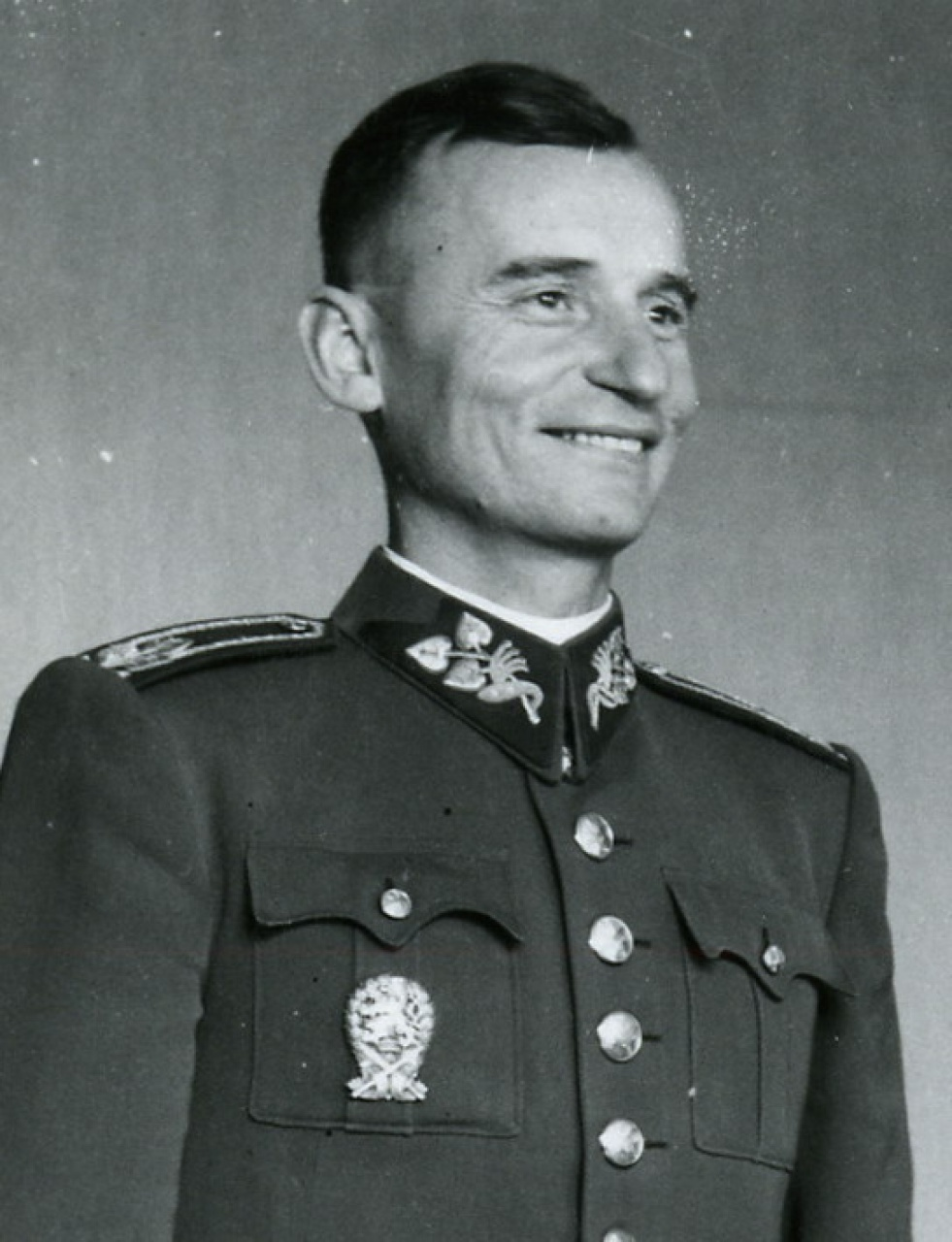
- Born: 26 January 1906; Dombóvár, Kingdom of Hungary, Austria-Hungary
- Died: 1945 (aged 38–39); Flossenbürg concentration camp, Bavaria, Nazi Germany
- Known for: First chief commander of the Slovak National Uprising
- Awards: Order of the Slovak National Uprising, 1st class (1945, in memoriam); Order of Ľudovít Štúr, 1st class (1995, in memoriam)

Ján Golian (26 January 1906 – 1945) was a Slovak Brigade General who became famous as one of the main organizers and the commander of the resistance 1st Czechoslovak Army in Slovakia during the Slovak National Uprising.

== Biography ==
Golian was born on 26 January 1906 in Dombóvár, in today's territory of Hungary. His parents were native Slovaks who came from Šurany.

He studied at the Military Academy in Hranice, in 1927 received the rank of lieutenant of artillery. In 1937 he received the rank of captain. He served as a staff officer in Trenčín. Golian belonged to a group of anti-Nazi-oriented officers. In January 1944 he was appointed chief of staff of the Slovak Ground Forces in Banská Bystrica, where he gathered a group of influential anti-Nazi-oriented officers maintaining contact with the Czechoslovak government-in-exile in London.

He was the supreme military leader of the uprising from 27 April 1944 (while the uprising was still in preparation) until the arrival of Division General Rudolf Viest on 7 October 1944. After the start of the Slovak National Uprising on 29 August 1944 Golian took command of the Slovak forces in central Slovakia, from the headquarters in Banská Bystrica. His units were intended to serve only as support for two Slovak divisions in eastern Slovakia that were supposed to secure a connection with the Soviet Red Army. However, organization of the resistance army in eastern Slovakia failed and German forces disarmed both Slovak divisions without resistance.

From the beginning of September Golian along with his staff organized the defence of the Slovak units encircled in central Slovakia. According to the testimony of his chief of staff Major Július Nosko, Golian assumed that the resistance's defence against German attacks could not last more than 14 days. On 7 October 1944 Golian was replaced in command of the resistance army forces by General Viest. Afterwards, General Ján Golian served as Viest's deputy. Despite fierce fighting, the outnumbered and surrounded resistance army could not resist the well-equipped and better-trained German forces. When Viest and Golian ordered their remaining units to start a guerrilla war on 27 October 1944, they did not know that it would be the last order they issued. Both generals were captured by German special forces on 3 November 1944 in Pohronský Bukovec. He was detained in the Flossenbürg concentration camp, but all information about what happened to him in the last days of the war vanished. It is believed that he was tortured and then murdered in Flossenbürg together with General Viest. Golian was officially listed as missing for 2 years after the war.

== See also ==
- List of people who disappeared
