= Raseiniai =

- City
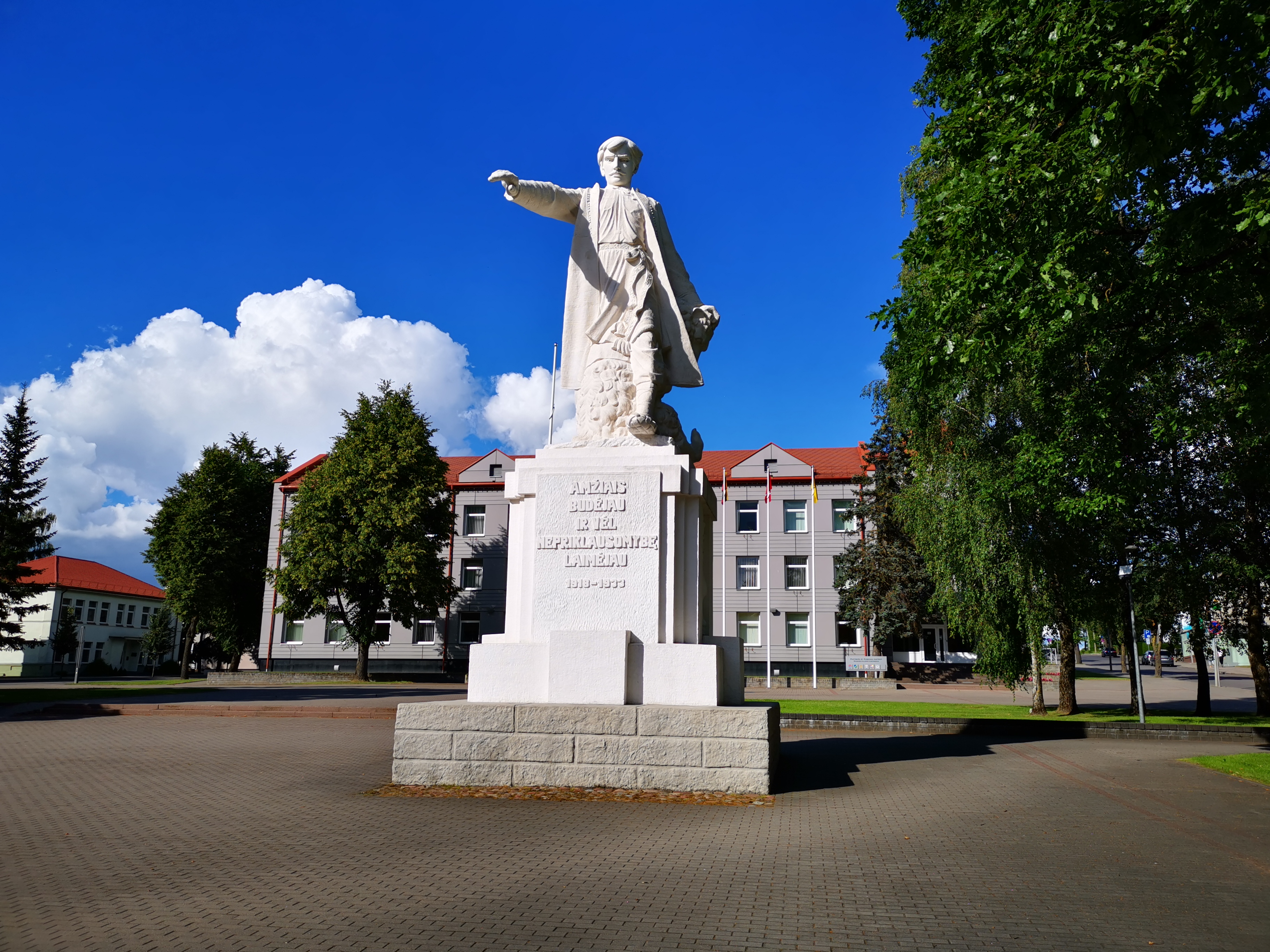
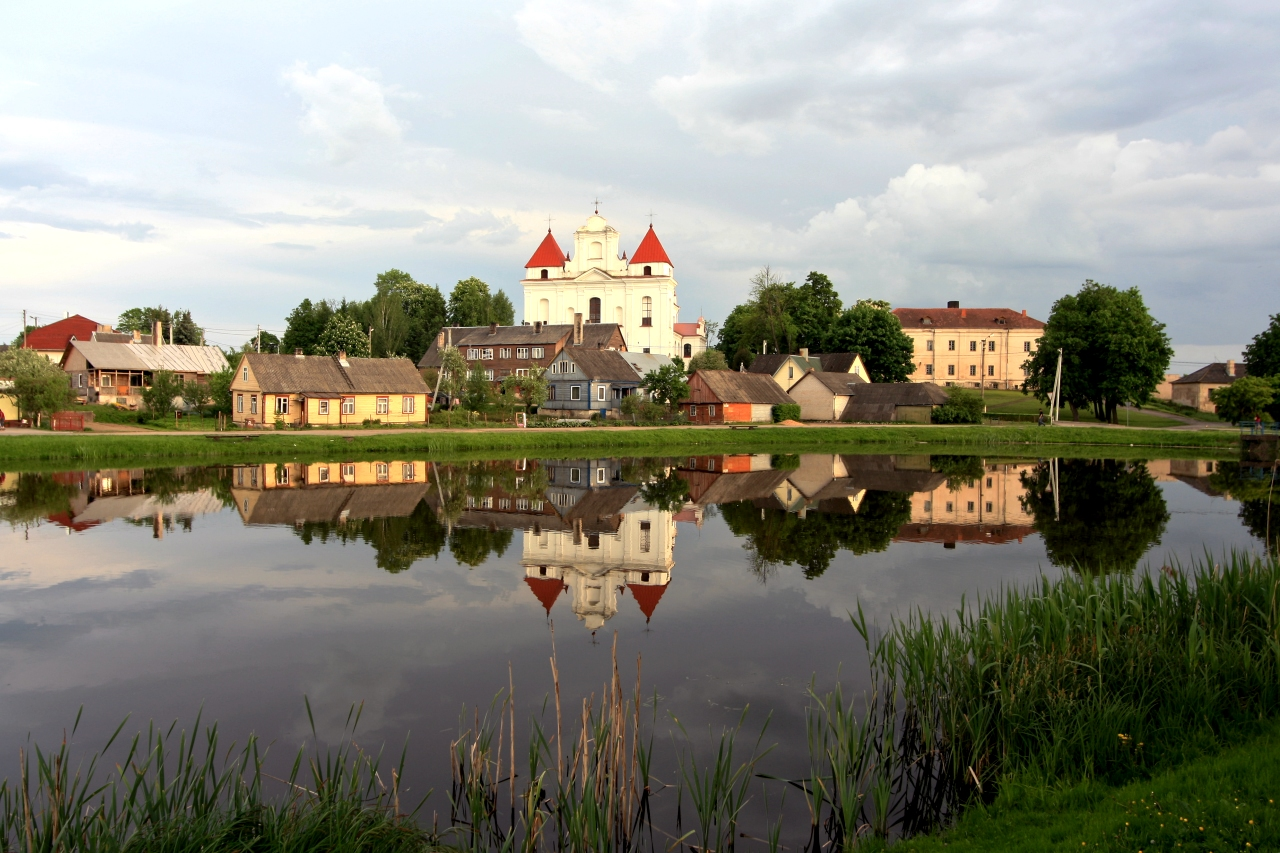
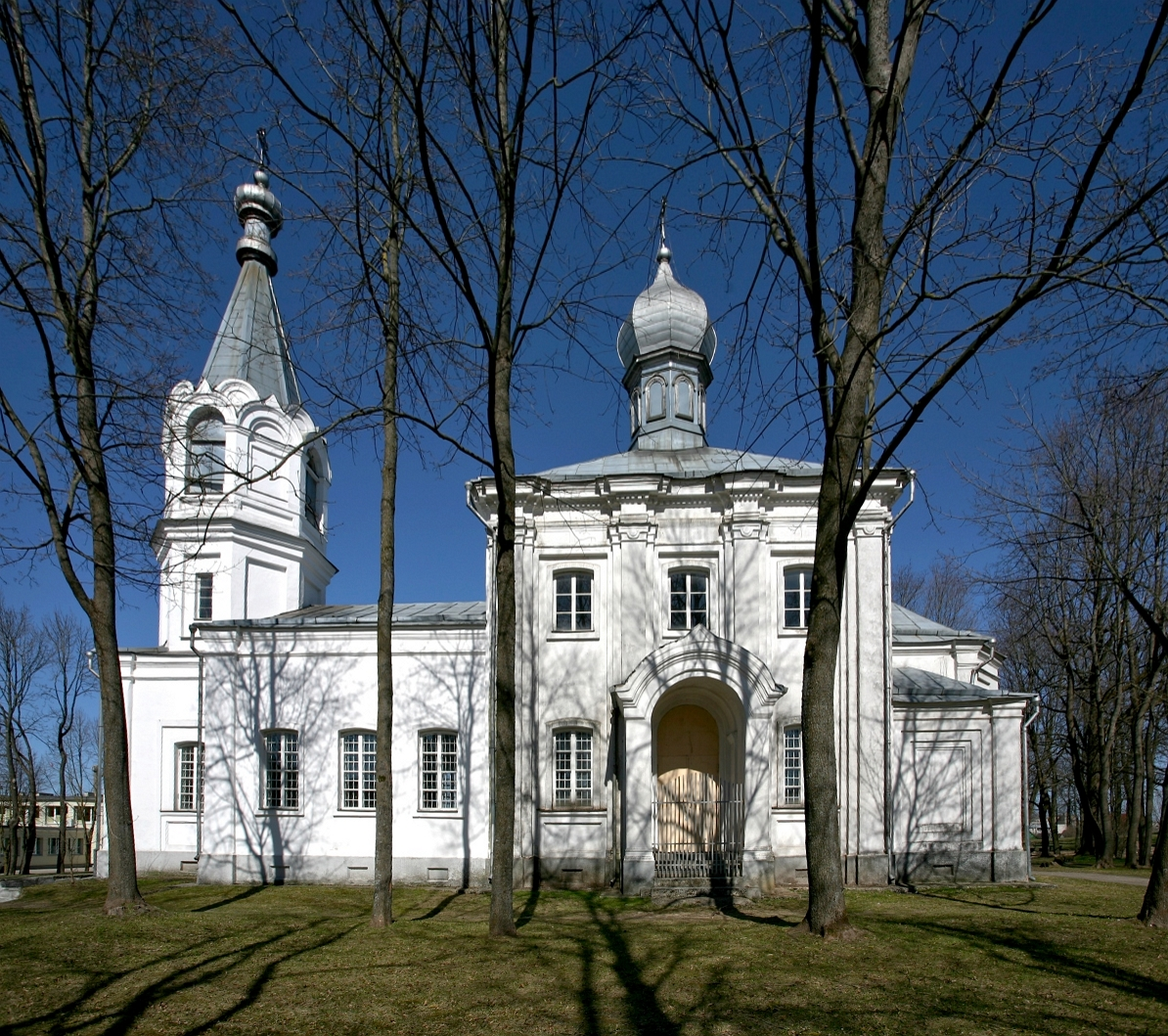
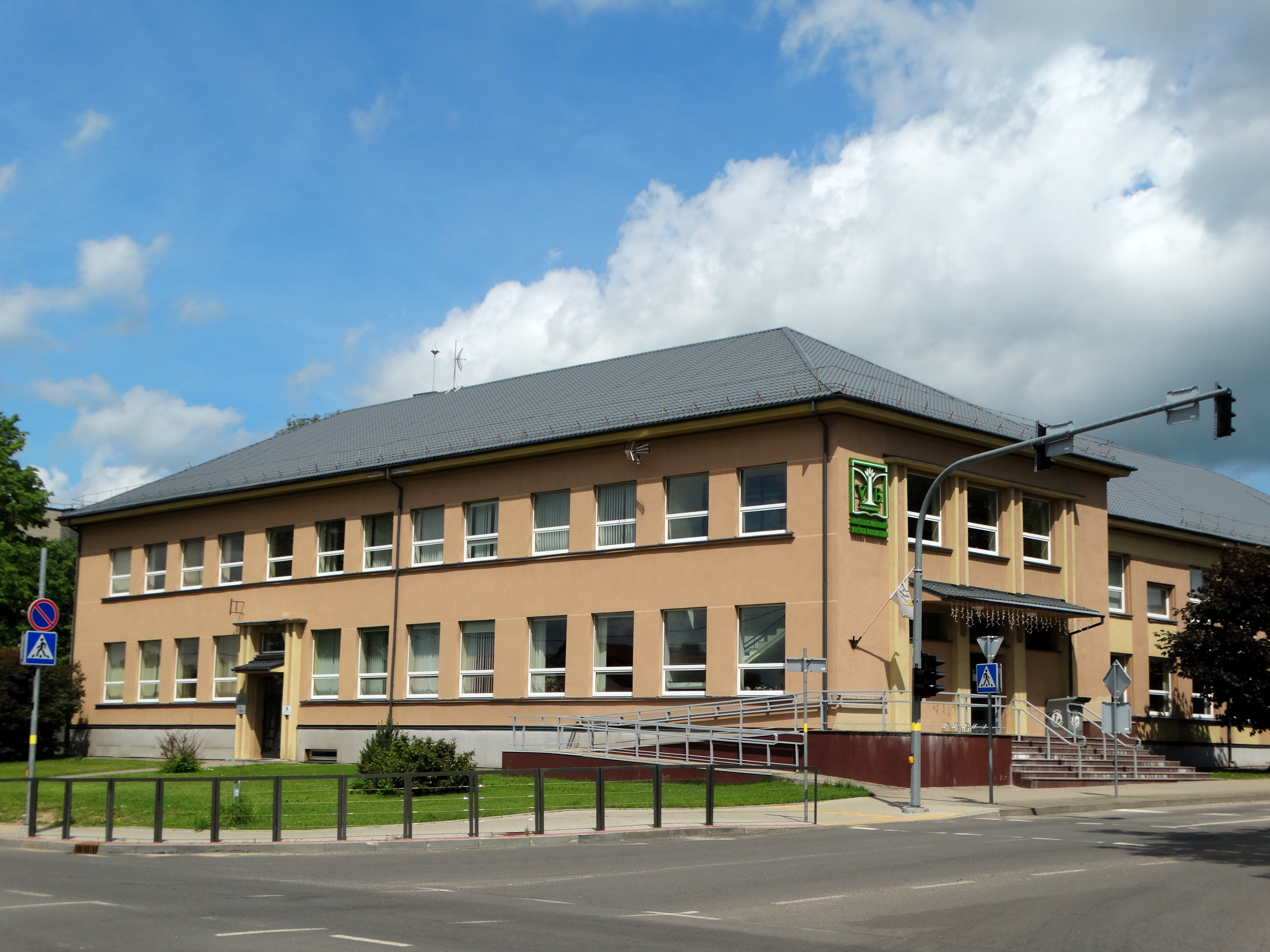
- Monument of Independence "Žemaitis" Catholic church Orthodox church New business centre "Senasis Žemaitis" Public library

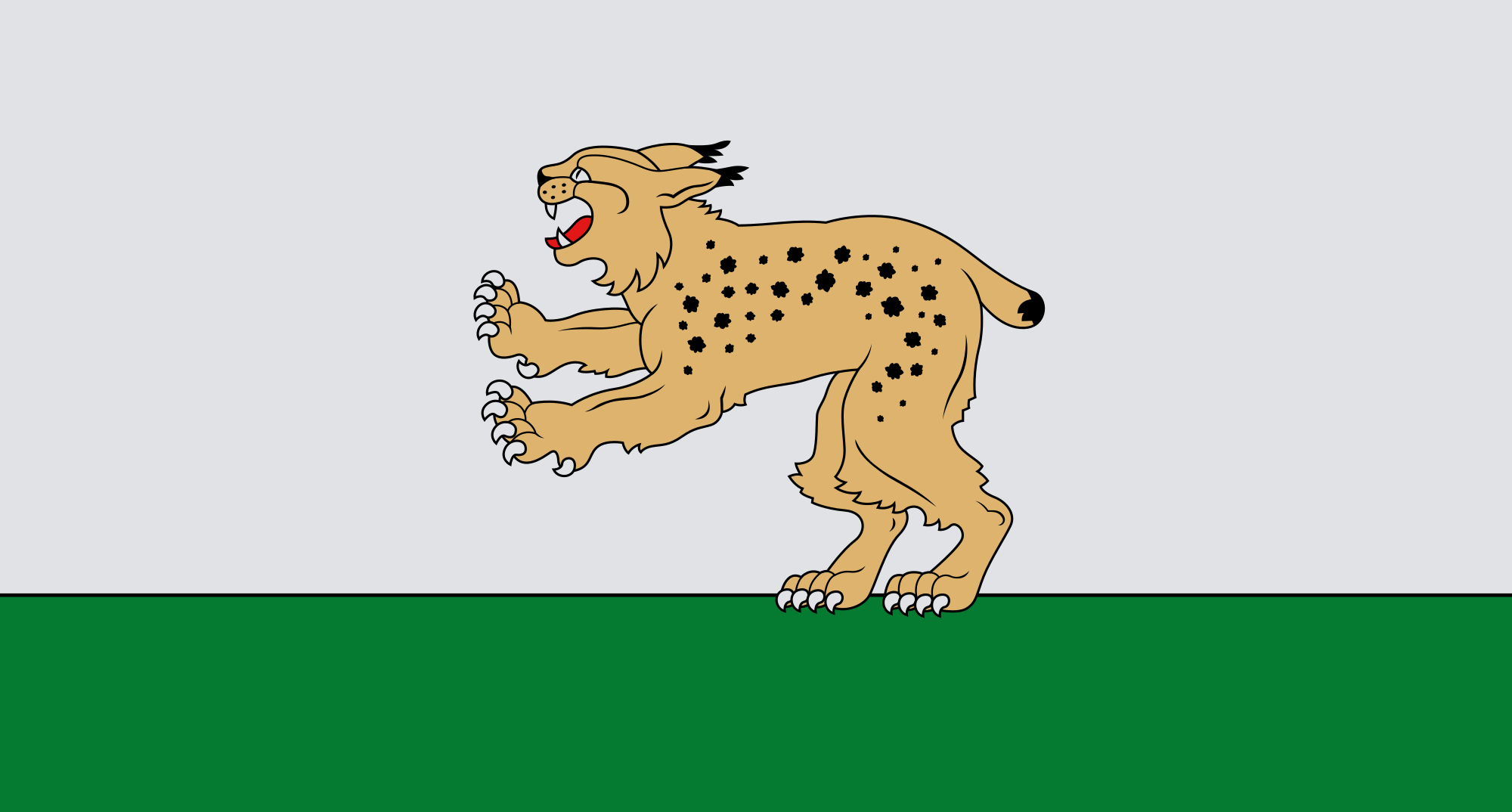
- Flag Coat of arms Brandmark

- Location of Raseiniai
- Coordinates: 55°22′N 23°7′E
- Country: Lithuania
- Ethnographic region: Samogitia
- County: Kaunas County
- Municipality: Raseiniai district municipality
- Eldership: Raseiniai town eldership
- Capital of: Raseiniai district municipality Raseiniai town eldership Raseiniai rural eldership
- First mentioned: 1253
- Granted town rights: 1492–1506

Population (2021)
  - Total: 9,865
- Time zone: UTC+2 (EET)
  - Summer (DST): UTC+3 (EEST)

Raseiniai (Samogitian: Raseinē) is a city in Lithuania. It is located on the south eastern foothills of the Samogitians highland, some 5 km (3.1 mi) north from the Kaunas–Klaipėda highway.

== History ==
=== Grand Duchy of Lithuania ===
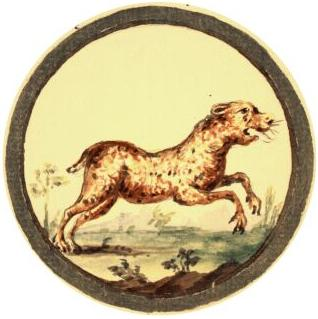
Coat of arms of Raseiniai, 1792

Raseiniai is one of the oldest communities in Lithuania – the name of the settlement was mentioned for the first time in 1253. Its name was mentioned in Chronicles of the 13th and 14th centuries under various names, including Rushigen, Rossyen, and Rasseyne. In 1253 Grand Duke Mindaugas ceded one part of the Samogitia territory, including some of the district around Raseiniai, to the Livonian Order, and the rest to the first bishop of Lithuania, Kristyan. In the 14th–18th centuries, Raseiniai was one of the most important towns in the Samogitia region.

At the end of the 14th century, the town became important centre, and its representative participated with others from the region in signing the peace treaty of Königsberg in 1390. At the end of the 15th century, Raseiniai was granted Magdeburg Rights.

In the Polish–Lithuanian Commonwealth the town became important in the region. Government institutions were located there, and it served as a mercantile center for the area. In 1580 the local aristocrats met there in order to choose their representatives to the General Sejm (parliament) in Warsaw. From 1585 Raseiniai served as the permanent location of the county parliament. In 1792 city Magdeburg rights were renewed. The 1st and 3rd Lithuanian National Cavalry Brigades were stationed in the town in the 1790s.

=== After the partitions of the Commonwealth ===
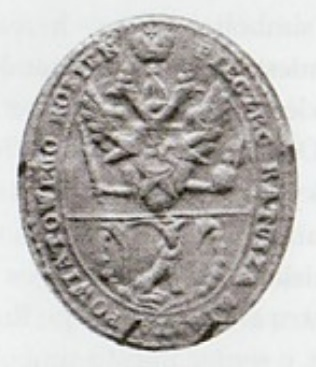
Coat of arms of the Raseiniai City Town Hall, used in 1801–1831

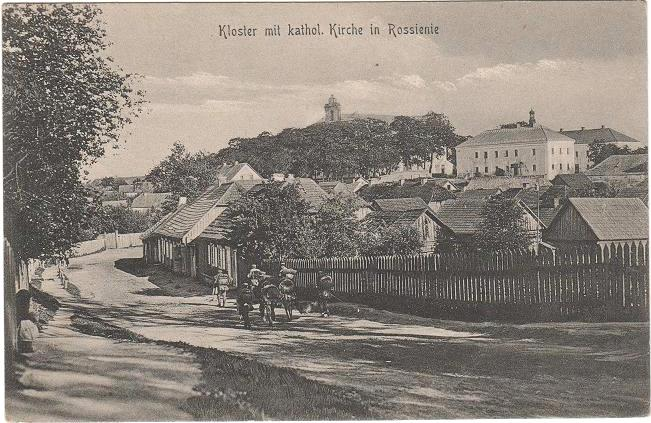
Monastery and church, 1916

Following the third partition of the Commonwealth in 1795, Raseiniai was annexed by the Russian Empire and its town rights were annulled. In the Russian Empire, the town was the center of a Rossieny County. From 1801 to 1843, the county was in the Vilna Governorate, and from 1843 on it became part of the Kovno Governorate.

Historically, the chief articles of commerce were wood and grain for export. Because of its geographic position and distance from the railroad and the main highways, it became economically isolated. A fire in 1865 which almost destroyed the town also contributed to the town's decline in the latter half of the 19th century.

In 1831, an insurrection against Tsarist oppression began in Raseiniai. On March 26, the rebels took Raseiniai and formed a provisional district government. Within a few days the insurrection spread throughout the entire country – and was later known as the 1831 Rebellion.

The town long had a large Jewish presence. It was among the first Jewish communities established in Lithuania, and the town, which is known in Yiddish as Raseyn, became known as the "Jerusalem of Zamut." Jews continued to settle there in large numbers throughout the 17th century.

During most of the 19th century, the greater proportion of the town's population was Jewish and it was a center of the Jewish Haskalah (Enlightenment) movement. In 1842 the city had 7,455 inhabitants, the majority of whom were Jews. In 1866 the town had 10,579 inhabitants, of whom 8,290 were Jews. In 1897 the population of the district, excluding the town, was 221,731, of whom about 17,000 were Jews. After World War I, however, the Jewish community was smaller. By 1926, 2,226 Jews lived in Raseiniai, and approximately 2,000 (40% of the general population) in 1939.

During most of the World War I, the town was occupied by the German army. In the spring of 1915, the Germans concentrated Army Group Lauenstein in the area of Tilsit, with three infantry and three cavalry divisions opposing one infantry division and units of border police and Russian volunteers. The Bavarian cavalry division swept through Raseiniai on April 14 en route to Šiauliai. Refugees from Raseiniai appeared in Šiauliai on the morning of April 15 warning of the German advance.

=== After World War I ===
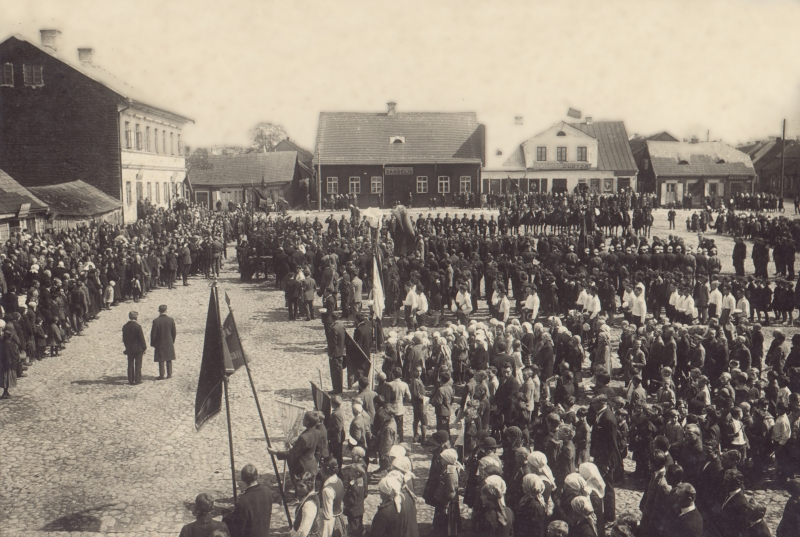
Commemoration of the Independence Day of Lithuania, 1928

When Lithuania regained Independence in 1918, Raseiniai became a district capital.

During World War II, Raseiniai was virtually ruined – approximately 90% of the buildings were destroyed. One survivor of the war is the Church of the Ascension of the Virgin Mary, which was built in 1782. The remains of the 17th–18th century monastery buildings also serve as a monument of Renaissance architecture.

Tourists invariably pause at The Samogitian statue in the central town square. The sculpture serves as a symbol of the Samogitia ethnographical zone – a strong man resolutely stepping forward after having tamed a bear (an allusion to the 1831 Rebellion). On the sides of the base there are three bas-reliefs depicting the struggle against Tsarist oppression. The sculpture, which is the work of Vincas Grybas (1890–1941), was erected in Raseiniai in 1933–1934.

=== World War II ===
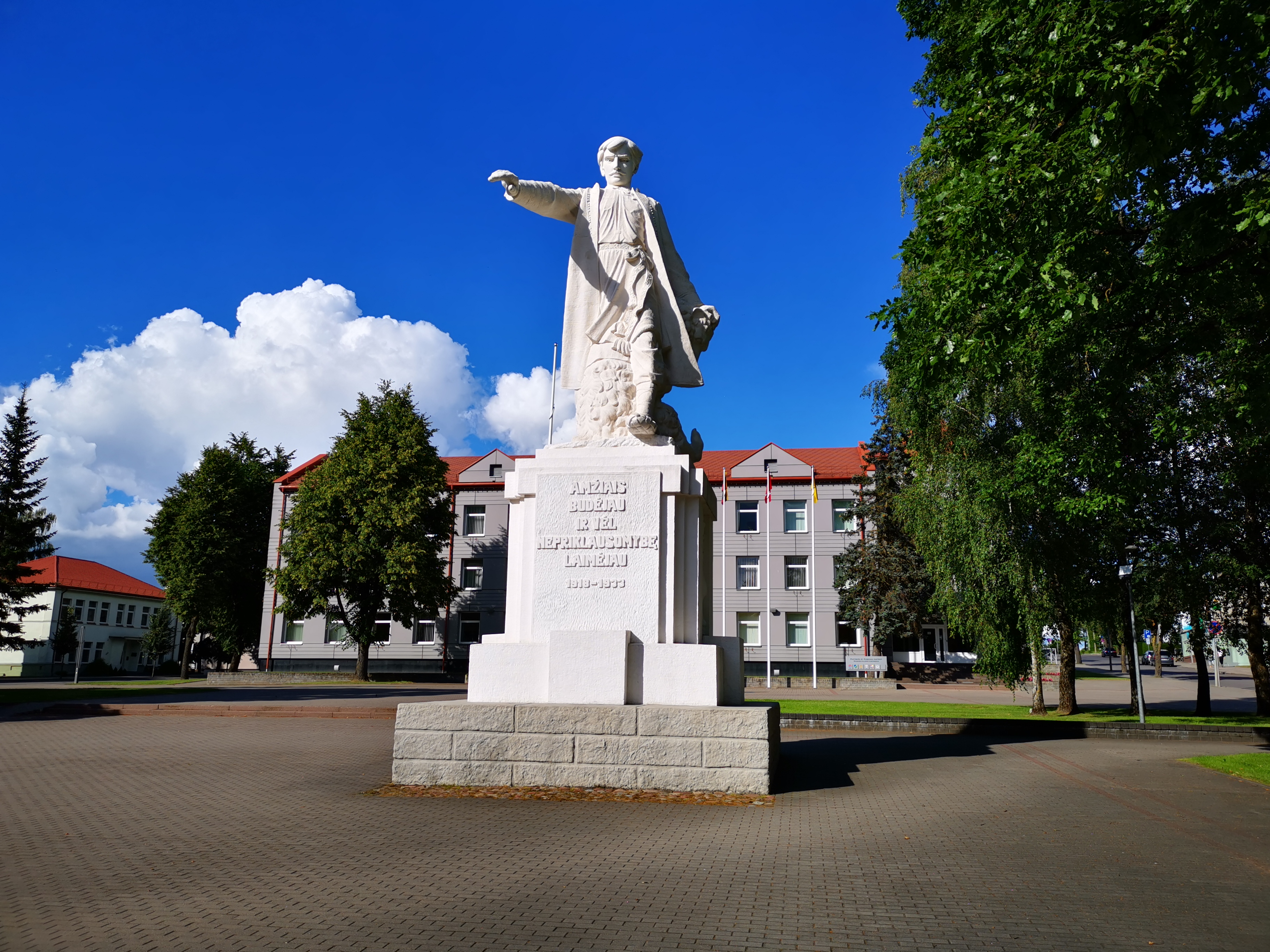
Monument of independence "Žemaitis" (Samogitian)

In June 1941, near Raseiniai, roughly 20 Kliment Voroshilov tanks (KVs) of the Soviet 3rd Mechanized Corps met the assault of the 6th Panzer Division, with approximately 100 vehicles. A single KV-1 tank managed to hold off the German advance for a full day while being pummeled by a variety of antitank weapons, until finally the KV-1 ran out of ammunition and was knocked out. Raseiniai was captured on 23 June 1941 by troops of the German Army Group North. On 25 July 1941, the town was placed under the administration of the newly created Reichskommissariat Ostland. On July 29 1941, 257 people (254 Jews, 3 Lithuanian communists) were killed. Raseiniai was recaptured on 9 August 1944 by Soviet troops of the 3rd Belorussian Front in the course of the Kaunas Offensive.

== Climate ==
Climate data for Raseiniai (1991–2020 normals)
Month	Jan	Feb	Mar	Apr	May	Jun	Jul	Aug	Sep	Oct	Nov	Dec	Year
Mean daily maximum °C (°F)	−1.0 (30.2)	0.2 (32.4)	4.4 (39.9)	12.1 (53.8)	17.9 (64.2)	21.0 (69.8)	23.5 (74.3)	22.8 (73.0)	17.3 (63.1)	10.4 (50.7)	4.4 (39.9)	0.5 (32.9)	11.1 (52.0)
Daily mean °C (°F)	−3.3 (26.1)	−2.8 (27.0)	0.6 (33.1)	6.9 (44.4)	12.2 (54.0)	15.4 (59.7)	17.9 (64.2)	17.1 (62.8)	12.4 (54.3)	6.8 (44.2)	2.2 (36.0)	−1.5 (29.3)	7.0 (44.6)
Mean daily minimum °C (°F)	−5.6 (21.9)	−5.4 (22.3)	−2.5 (27.5)	2.2 (36.0)	6.6 (43.9)	10.1 (50.2)	12.8 (55.0)	12.1 (53.8)	8.3 (46.9)	3.9 (39.0)	0.3 (32.5)	−3.6 (25.5)	3.3 (37.9)
Average precipitation mm (inches)	54 (2.1)	40 (1.6)	39 (1.5)	32 (1.3)	51 (2.0)	66 (2.6)	85 (3.3)	73 (2.9)	55 (2.2)	68 (2.7)	59 (2.3)	54 (2.1)	676 (26.6)
Average relative humidity (%)	88	86	80	71	70	74	76	77	82	87	91	91	81
Source: Lithuanian Hydrometeorological Service
