= 3rd Air Defense Composite Brigade =

5th Anti-Aircraft Missile Division (1967-76) 1st Anti-Aircraft Missile Regiment (1976-85) 3rd Air Defense Composite Brigade (1985-)
- Active: 1967.7.1 -
- Country: People's Republic of China
- Branch: People's Liberation Army Air Force
- Type: Brigade
- Role: Air Defense
- Garrison/HQ: Shanghai

5th Anti-Aircraft Missile Division of the Air Force (Chinese: 空军地空导弹第5师) was activated on July 1, 1965, in Shanghai. The division was composed of 9 HQ-2 missile battalion, being responsible for the anti-air defense of the vicinity of Shanghai.

On April 1, 1976, the division was reduced to 1st Anti-Aircraft Missile Regiment of the Air Force(Chinese: 空军地空导弹第1团).

In September 1985, the regiment merged with 3rd Antiaircraft Artillery Division of the Air Force and became 3rd Air Defense Composite Brigade (Chinese: 防空混成第3旅).
