= Kazimierz Fabrycy =

Polish general (1888–1958)

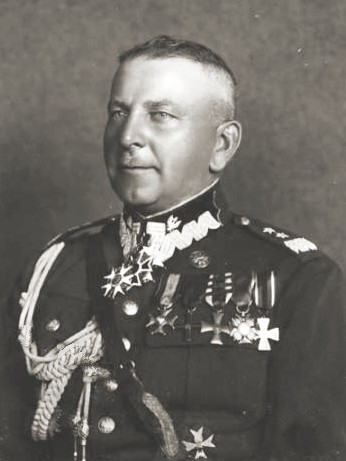
Kazimierz Fabrycy

Kazimierz Fabrycy (3 March 1888 in Odessa – 18 July 1958) was a Polish general.

== Early life ==
Kazimierz Fabrycy was born on March 3, 1888, in Odessa, in the Kherson Governorate of the Russian Empire. Upon graduating from school in Niemirów he enrolled for a year-long military service in the Russian army. He followed this with enrollment at Polytechnic School of Lviv and then later at the Technical University of Munich. From this latter institution he was conferred a degree in engineering. Even as a student Kazimierz flung himself into activities of the Polish independence movement. Between 1908 and 1910 he co-founded first the Union of Active Struggle and then the Rifle Association.

== Later career ==
Fabrycy was a member of the Polish Legions in World War I, and fought in the Polish Soviet War.

He was the Viceminister of military affairs from 1926 to 1934, and commander of several infantry divisions during the interwar period in the Second Polish Republic.

During the Invasion of Poland of 1939, Fabrycy was the commander of Armia Karpaty and later the Romanian Bridgehead area.

After being evacuated to Romania, he was given assignments of small importance in the recreated Polish Army in the Middle East area. Fabrycy remained in exile, and died in 1958 in London.

== Honours and awards ==
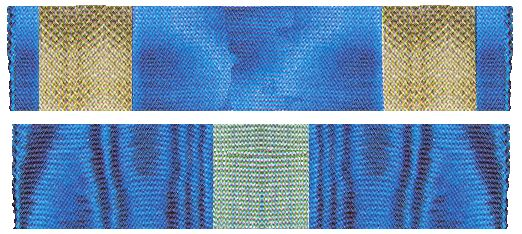
Silver Cross of the Order of Virtuti Militari (No. 2771)
Grand Cross of the Order of Polonia Restituta, previously awarded the Commander's Cross with Star and the Commander's Cross
Cross of Independence
Cross of Valour - four times
Gold Cross of Merit
Mark officers "Parasol"
Order of the Cross of the Eagle, 1st Class (Estonia, 1933)
Grand Officer's Cross of the Legion of Honour, previously awarded the Commander's Cross
Commander's Cross with Star of the Order of the Crown of Romania
