= Carpathian Army =

1939 Polish Army formation

Karpaty Army (Polish: Armia Karpaty, lit. 'Carpathian Army') was formed on 11 July 1939 under Major General Kazimierz Fabrycy after Nazi Germany created a puppet state of Slovakia and the Protectorate of Bohemia and Moravia was proclaimed after the events that lead to the breakup of Czechoslovakia. According to Polish historians Czesław Grzelak and Henryk Stańczyk, it consisted of two mountain brigades, Lwów Brigade of National Defence and a Battalion Węgry (Hungary). Altogether, Karpaty Army was made of 26 battalions, 160 cannons and 16 planes.

== Tasks ==
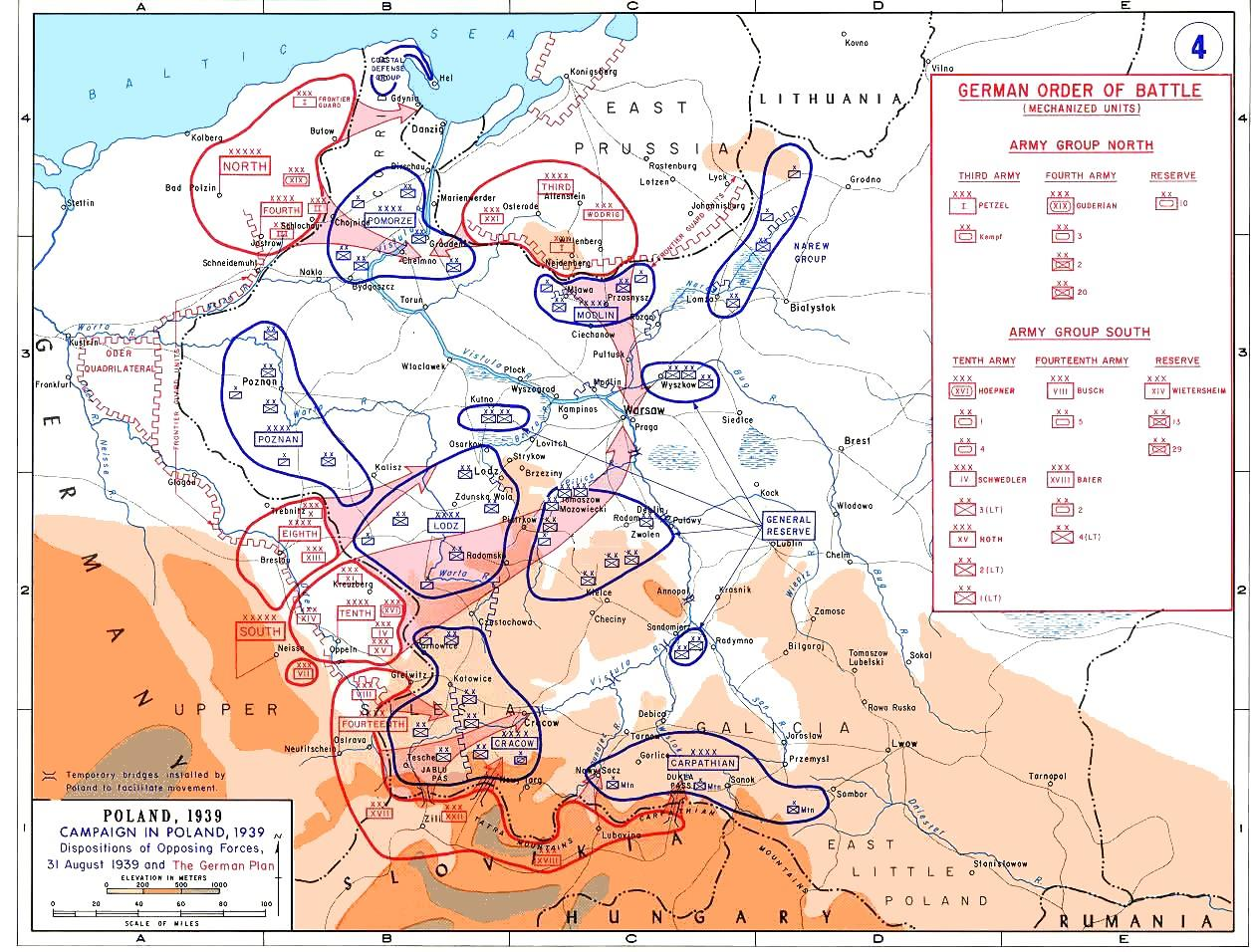
Forces as of 31 August and German plan of attack.

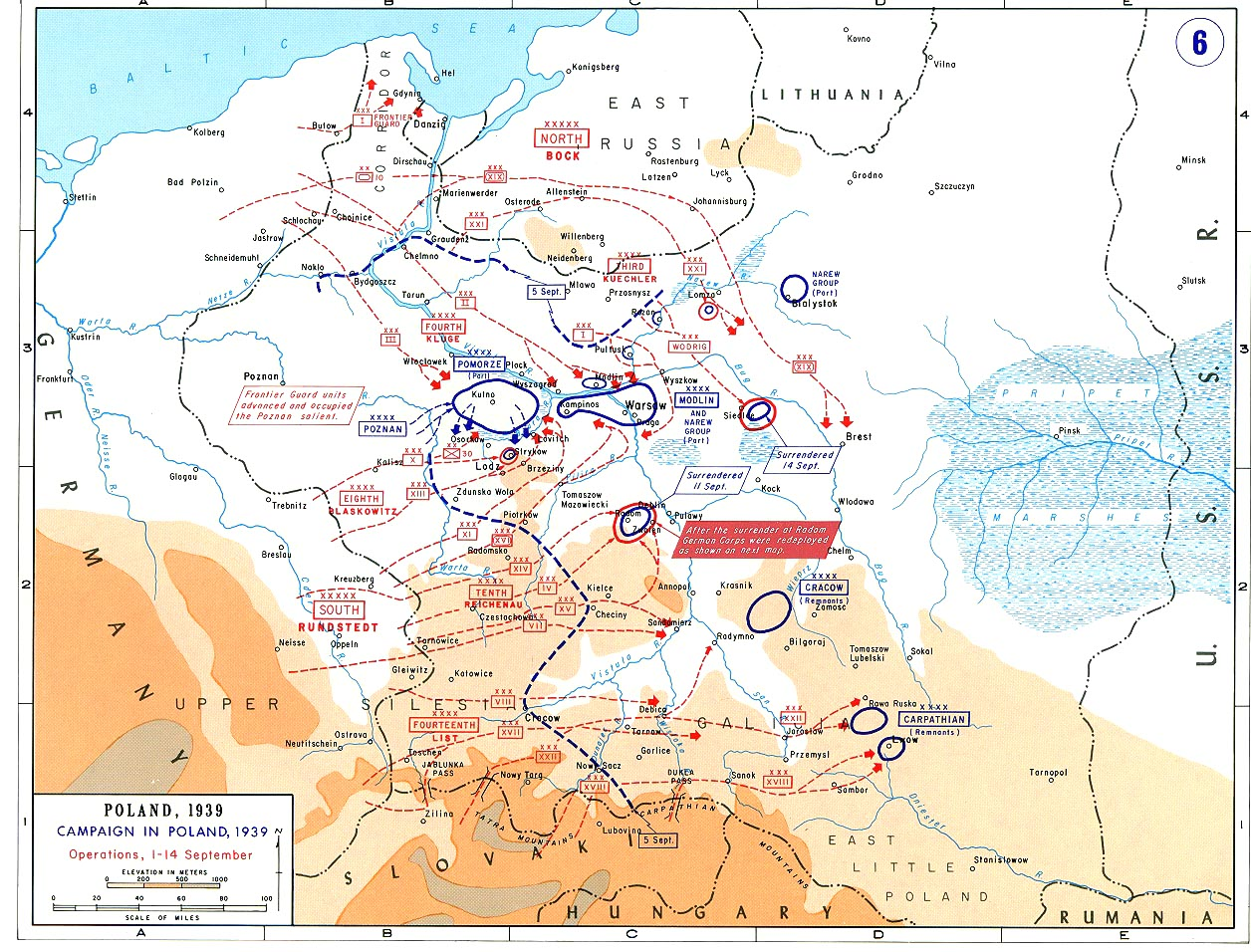
Forces as of 14 September with troop movements up to this date.

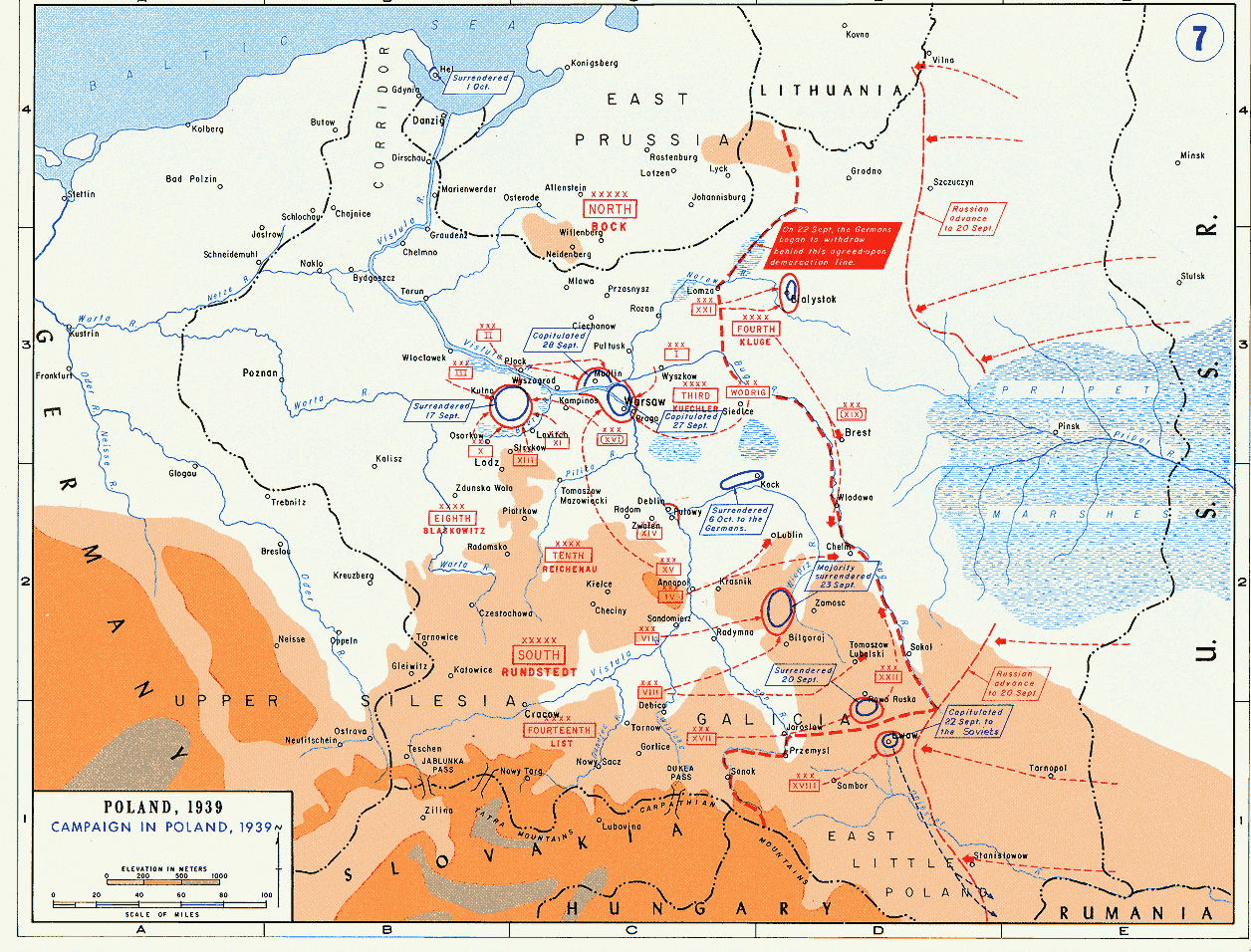
Forces after 14 September with troop movements after this date

The main task of the army was to secure mountain passes in the Carpathians from Czorsztyn to the Polish-Romanian border (total length 350 kilometers) and to protect the Centralny Okręg Przemysłowy industrial region. Furthermore, it was tasked with the protection of southern wing of Kraków Army, and the oil-rich area of Borysław and Drohobycz. In late August 1939, concentration of Karpaty Army was not yet completed, as it was to be fully operational only after the completion of mobilization of the Polish Army. Karpaty Army was the weakest of all Polish armies in 1939, lacking heavy equipment, and manned by older officers. Since the first hours of the war, Karpaty Army faced well-prepared Gebirgsjäger German divisions, whose superiority was obvious.

== Operational history ==
Initially the army consisted of two improvised mountain brigades and a number of smaller units, but later in the course of war (on September 6) it was joined by forces of the withdrawing Armia Kraków, and renamed Armia Małopolska. From 11 September 1939, it was commanded by General Kazimierz Sosnkowski (after General Fabrycy was reassigned to command the Polish Southern Front). On September 1 in the morning, Karpaty Army was attacked in the area of Czorsztyn by the 4th Light Division of the Wehrmacht, supported by the 2nd Mountain Division. Backed by the Slovak units (see Slovak invasion of Poland), the German divisions managed to break through Polish positions near Tymbark and Limanowa, causing a gap between Karpaty Army and the retreating Kraków Army. As a result, Polish headquarters agreed for a withdrawal. In the first days of the invasion, Karpaty Army lacked reserve units, as its main forces, the 24th and 11th Infantry Divisions, were either still mobilized, or were on their way towards the area of Tarnów.

The Army took heavy casualties retreating through the San river and was destroyed during the Battle of Lwów on September 20.

== Organization ==
Karpaty Army was commanded by General Kazimierz Fabrycy. His chief of staff was Colonel Witold Dzierżykraj-Morawski.

- 2nd Mountain Brigade (2 Brygada Górska)
- 3rd Mountain Brigade (3 Brygada Górska)
- Carpathian Half-Brigade of National Defence (Karpacka Półbrygada ON)
- 1st Regiment of the Border Defence Corps
- 1st Motorized Artillery Regiment
- 9th Heavy Artillery Regiment

Additionally, mobilisation plans called for the creation of Tarnów Group consisting of:

- 22nd Infantry Division
- 38th Infantry Division

On 4 September the Army was strengthened by reserve units:

- 11th Infantry Division
- 24th Infantry Division
- 38th Infantry Division
