= 3rd Communication Brigade =

3rd Unified Field Communications Brigade
- 3-тя об'єднана польова бригада зв'язку
- Insignia
- Active: 1992 - Present
- Country: Ukraine
- Branch: General Staff of the Armed Forces
- Role: Communications
- Garrison/HQ: Kyiv, Kyiv Oblast
- Engagements: Russo-Ukrainian War

The 3rd Unified Field Communications Brigade (MUN A0415) is a brigade level unit of the Armed Forces of Ukraine, subordinated directly to the General Staff of the Ukrainian Armed Forces and is tasked with Radar, radio technical and communication support. It is headquartered in Kyiv.

== History ==
It is subordinated directly to the General Staff of the Ukrainian Armed Forces and is headquartered in Brovary.

In August 2000, it conducted exercises in Semipolki, deploying R-417 radars. In December 2013, it was mobilized by the Ukrainian government in the wake of Euromaidan.

Following the Russian invasion of Ukraine, it saw action. On 17 September 2024, a soldier of the brigade (Kaverzin Oleksandr Oleksandrovych) was killed in Danylo during the Kursk campaign by a Russian airstrike. On 6 December 2024, a soldier of the brigade (Shelestyuk Taras Volodymyrovych) was killed in action in Kursk Oblast. On 28 December 2024, two Soldiers of the brigade (Rodyna Yevheni Borysovych and Biletsky Bohdan Yuriovych) were killed by Russian rocket strikes in Kursk Oblast.
