= 3rd Security Force Assistance Brigade =

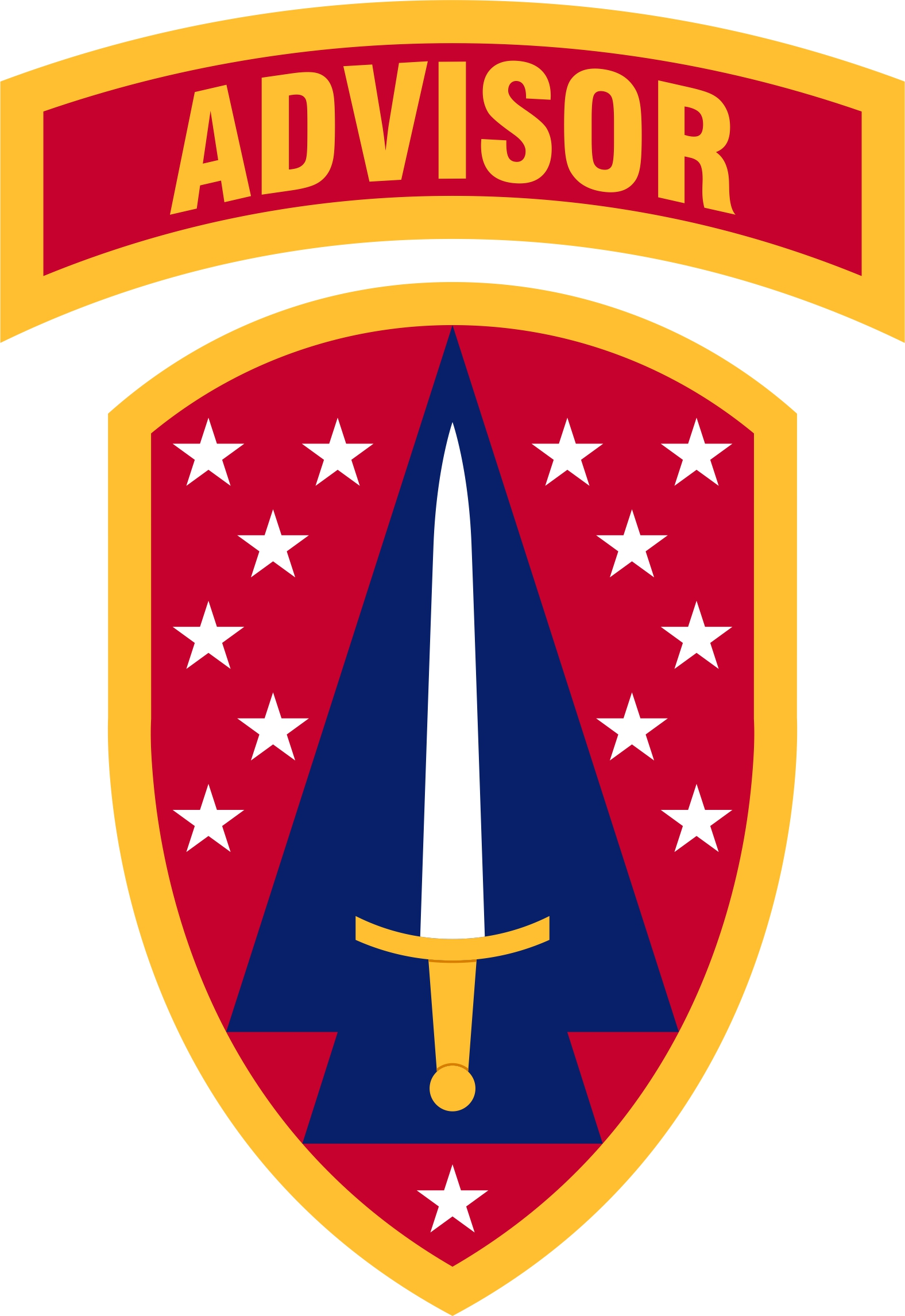
- The SFAB's shoulder sleeve insignia
- Founded: January 2019–present
- Country: United States of America
- Branch: United States Army
- Type: Military education and training
- Role: Train and advise foreign militaries Security force assistance
- Garrison/HQ: Fort Hood, Texas, U.S.
- Color of Beret: Brown

Commanders
- Current commander: Col. Edward L. Arntson III
- Command Sergeant Major: Hays

Insignia
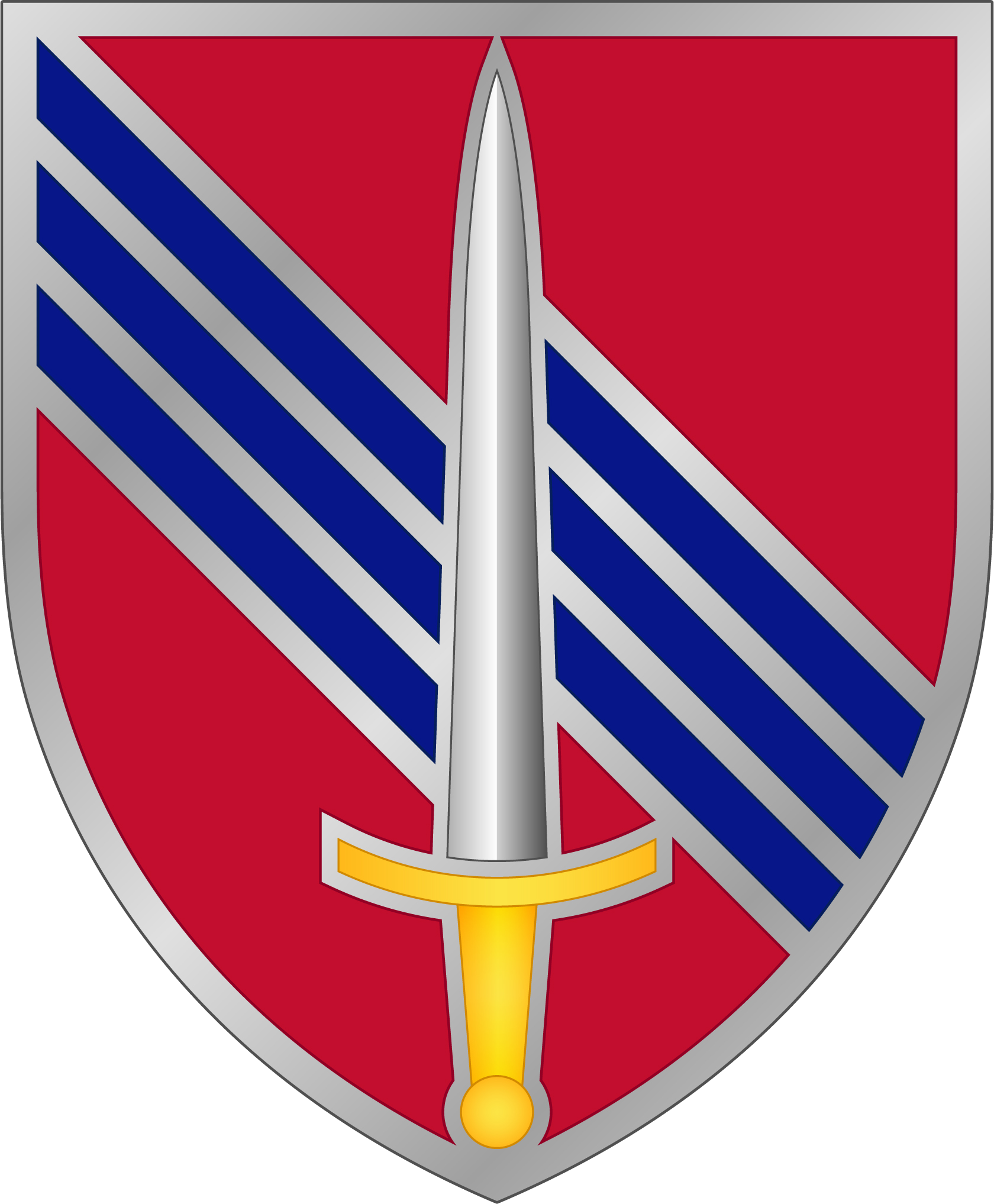
- Distinctive unit insignia

- Beret flash

The 3rd Security Force Assistance Brigade (3rd SFAB) is a Security force assistance brigade of the United States Army. It is based in Fort Hood, Texas.

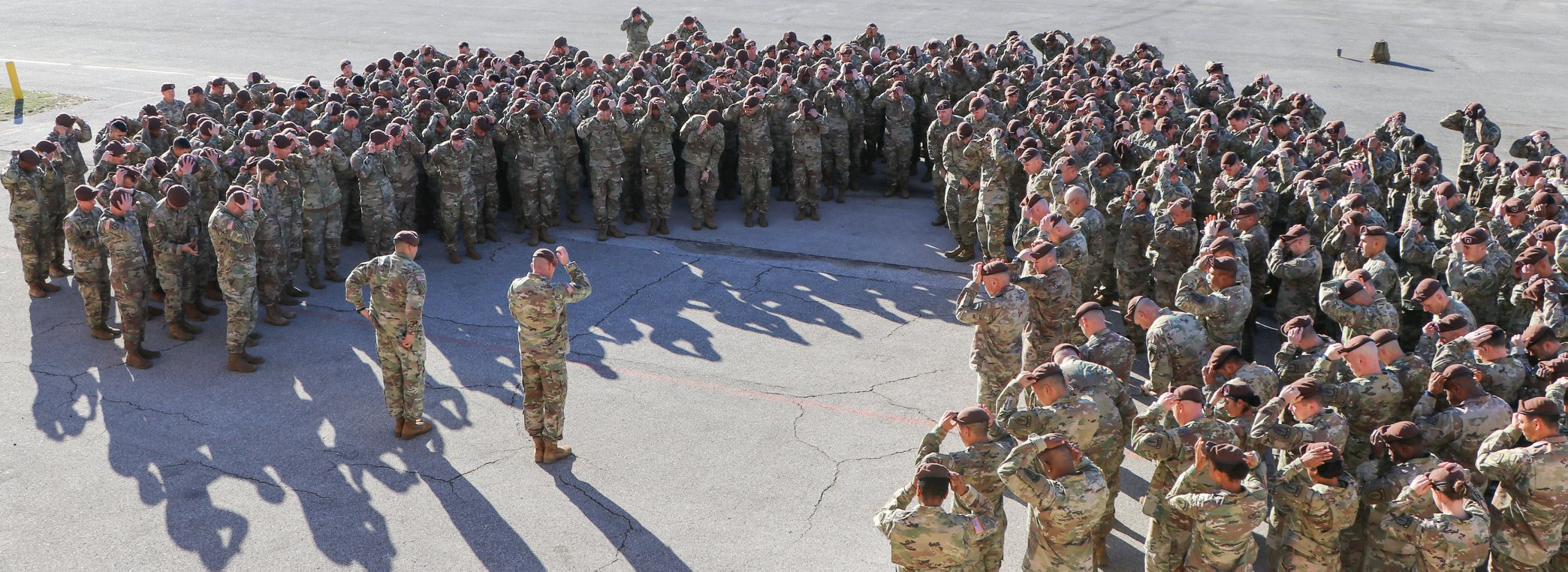
Advisors from the 3rd Security Force Assistance Brigade don their brown berets at a ceremony standing up the unit

== Security Force Assistance Brigades ==
SFABs are brigades whose mission is to train, advise, and assist other states' armed forces. Operationally, an 800-soldier SFAB would free-up a 4,500-soldier Brigade Combat Team from a training and advisory mission.

On 23 June 2016 General Mark Milley revealed plans for train/advise/assist Brigades, consisting of seasoned officers and NCOs with a full chain of command, but no junior Soldiers. The SFABs were to consist of 800 senior officers and NCOs, which, the Army says, could act as a cadre to reform a full brigade combat team in a matter of months. In May 2017, the initial SFAB staffing of 529 soldiers was underway, including 360 officers. The officers will have had previous command experience. Commanders and leaders will have previously led BCTs at the same echelon. The remaining personnel, all senior NCOs, are being recruited from across the Army. Promotable E-4s who volunteer for the SFAB are automatically promoted to Sergeant upon completion of the Military Advisor Training Academy. In the event of a national emergency SFABs could be augmented with new soldiers entering basic training and advanced individual training.

On 16 October 2017, Brigadier General Brian Mennes of Force Management in the Army's G3/5/7 announced accelerated deployment of the first two SFABs, possibly by Spring 2018 to Afghanistan and Iraq, if required. This was approved in early July 2017, by the Secretary of Defense and the Chief of Staff of the Army. These two SFABs would be trained in languages, how to work with interpreters, and equipped with the latest equipment including secure, but unclassified, communications and weapons to support coalition partners, as well as unmanned aircraft systems (UASs). An SFAB could provide up to 58 teams (possibly with additional personnel for force protection).

A team of twelve soldiers would include a medic, personnel for intelligence support, and air support.

== Brigade deployment plans ==
The brigade was established on 4 January 2019. In August 2019 it was announced that 3rd SFAB would relieve 2nd Security Force Assistance Brigade in Afghanistan for the Winter 2019 rotation. On 10 June 2021, the brigade cased its colors in preparation for deploying 20 teams in 10 nations across the United States Central Command area of responsibility.
