= 3rd Lithuanian National Cavalry Brigade =

- Active: 1792-1795
- Country: Grand Duchy of Lithuania
- Type: Cavalry
- Garrison/HQ: Raseiniai
- Engagements: Vilnius Uprising 1794

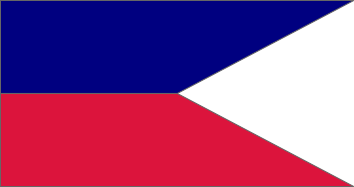
3rd Lithuanian National Cavalry Brigade

The 3rd Lithuanian National Cavalry Brigade (Polish: 3 Brygada Kawalerii Narodowej Wielkiego Księstwa Litewskiego) was a military unit of the Grand Duchy of Lithuania led by Józef Antoni Kossakowski.

== History ==
=== Origins ===
The brigade was formed in 1792.

=== Organisation ===
The brigade was organised into banners, per which there were two squadrons.

=== Commanders ===
The commanders of the unit were:

- Brigadier-Commandant — Józef Antoni Kossakowski
- Vicebrigadier-vicecommandant — Józef Białłozor
- Major — Marcin Białłozor
- Aide-de-camp — Stanisław Eysymont
- Quartermaster-lieutenant — Stanisław Hromyko
- Judge advocat — Adamowicz

=== 1792-1794 ===
The regiment was stationed in Raseiniai. As of April 1794, there were 332 men in the brigade, although it was supposed to be 419. At the time, it was organised into four banners.

=== Kościuszko Uprising ===
The unit partook in the Vilnius Uprising on 11 August 1794.
