= 3rd Support Brigade =

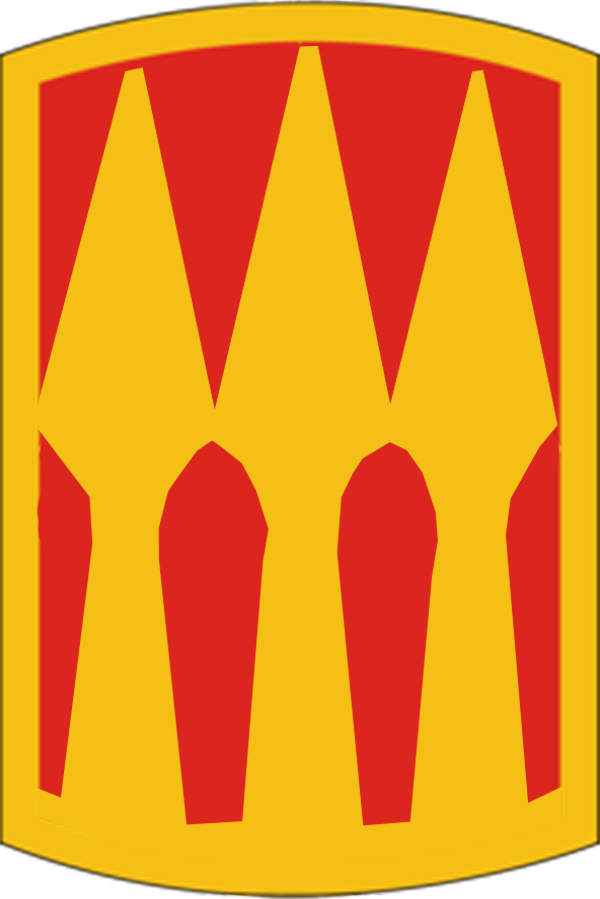
- Active: 1964–1969
- Country: United States
- Allegiance: Seventh Army
- Branch: US Army
- Role: Support
- Size: Brigade
- Garrison/HQ: Ludwigsburg, Germany

The 3rd Support Brigade was a service, transportation and supply support brigade for the Seventh Army during the Cold War in Germany. The unit was formed around 1964 to support Seventh Army units across Germany and was reflagged as the VII Corps Support Command in 1969.

== Subordinate Units (1965) ==
1st Maint Bn (Direct Support)	Stuttgart
71st Maint Bn (Direct Support)	Zirndorf
87th Maint Bn (General Support)	Nellingen
35th Sup & Svc Bn (Direct Support)	Ludwigsburg
95th Sup & Svc Bn (General Support)(Forward)	Fürth
242nd Sup & Svc Bn (General Support)(Forward)	Texas Area, Munich

== Subordinate Units (1967) ==
HHC, 3rd Spt Bde	Grenadier Kaserne, Zuffenhausen
3rd Ord Det (Explos Disp)	Infantry Kaserne, Augsburg
25th Cbt Spt Co (General Support)	WO Darby Kaserne, Fürth
27th AG Unit (Postal)(Type V)	Warner Barracks, Bamberg
29th Trans Co (Aircraft Direct Support)	Stuttgart AAF, Echterdingen
HHC, 35th Cbt Spt Bn (S&S)(Direct Support)	Coffey Barracks, Ludwigsburg
A Co, 35th CS Bn (S&S)(Direct Support)	Coffey Barracks, Ludwigsburg
B Co, 35th CS Bn (S&S)(Direct Support)	Coffey Barracks, Ludwigsburg
C Co, 35th CS Bn (S&S)(Direct Support)	Kelley Barracks, Möhringen
42nd Cbt Spt Co (Hvy Equip Maintenance )	Merrell Barracks, Nürnberg
42nd Fin Sec (Distributed Accounting)	Leighton Barracks, Würzburg
55th Cbt Spt Co (General Support)	Leighton Barracks, Würzburg
66th Cbt Spt Co (Hvy Equip Maintenance )	Harvey Barracks, Kitzingen
HQ & A Co, 71st CS Bn (Maintenance )(Direct Support)	Pinder Barracks, Zirndorf
B Co, 71st CS Bn (Maintenance )(Direct Support)	Conn Barracks, Schweinfurt
C Co, 71st CS Bn (Maintenance )(Direct Support)	Ammo Depot, Bamberg
D Co, 71st CS Bn (Maintenance )(Direct Support)	Merrell Barracks, Nürnberg
78th Cbt Spt Co (Lt Equip Maintenance )	Panzer Kaserne, Böblingen
HHD, 87th Cbt Spt Bn (Maintenance )(General Support)	Nellingen Kaserne, Nellingen
HHC, 95th Cbt Spt (S&S) (Forward)	WO Darby Kaserne, Fürth
124th Cbt Spt Co (Hvy Equip Maintenance )	Nellingen Kaserne, Nellingen
152nd Trans Det (Cargo Hel)(F-M)	Nellingen Kaserne, Nellingen
179th Sig Pltn (Spt Bde)	Grenadier Kaserne, Zuffenhausen
182nd Cbt Spt Co (Lt Equip Maintenance )	WO Darby Kaserne, Fürth
206th Ord Co (GM)(Direct Support)	Merrell Barracks, Nürnberg
HHC, 242nd Cbt Spt (S&S) (Forward)	Texas Area, Munich
353rd QM Det (Prcht Pack)	Storck Barracks, Illesheim
538th Cbt Spt Co (Col Cls-Salv)	Nellingen Kaserne, Nellingen
564th Cbt Spt Co (Rep Part)(Forward)	Nelson Barracks, Neu Ulm
569th AG Co (Pers Svcs)(Type B)	Flak Kaserne, Ludwigsburg
572nd Cbt Spt Co (Hvy Equip Maintenance )	Wharton Barracks, Heilbronn
591st Trans Co (Aircraft Direct Support)	Storck Barracks, Illesheim
602nd Cbt Spt Co (General Support)	Infantry Kaserne, Augsburg
613th Cbt Spt Co (Fld Svc)(Forward)	Alabama Area, Munich
628th Cbt Spt Co (Fld Svc)(Forward)	WO Darby Kaserne, Fürth
656th QM Co (Petroleum Support)(Forward)	Merrell Barracks, Nürnberg
657th QM Co (Petroleum Support)(Forward)	Texas Area, Munich
903rd Cbt Spt Co (Hvy Equip Maintenance )	Nellingen Kaserne, Nellingen
