= 3rd Mountain Brigade (Poland) =

WW2 Polish Army unit

3rd Mountain Brigade (3. Brygada Gorska) was a unit of the Polish Army, which took part in the Polish September Campaign in 1939. Commanded by Colonel Jan Stefan Kotowicz, it was part of Operational Group “Slovakia” of Armia Karpaty. It guarded southern Polish border from Gorlice to the Bieszczady Mountains.

First days of the war were quiet in that area, but on September 7, the German 1st Mountain Division attacked Polish positions in the junction of the 2nd and 3rd Mountain Brigades. Next day, after the Slovaks captured Rymanow Zdroj and the Germans seized Krosno, the Brigade was ordered to withdraw to Sanok and leave Dukla.

On September 10, the Brigade fought the aggressors in the area of Sanok, but was forced to retreat towards Turka. Between September 16 and 17 it attacked the Germans in Sambor, and three days later remnants of the unit left Poland for Hungary.

== See also ==
- Polish army order of battle in 1939
- Polish contribution to World War II
