= Pohronský Bukovec =

Pohronský Bukovec Bukóc
- Municipality
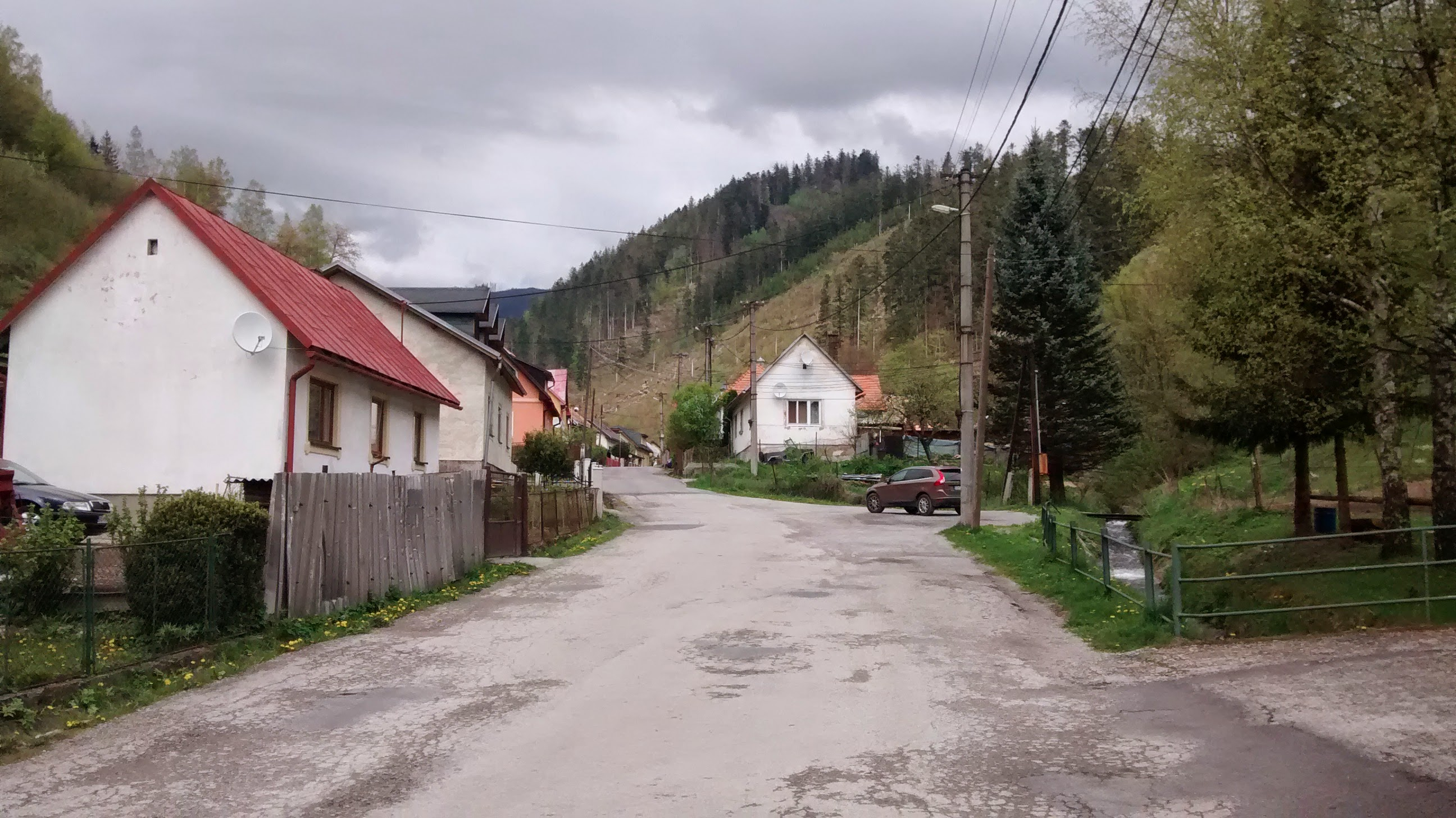

- Flag

- Location of Pohronský Bukovec in the Banská Bystrica Region Location of Pohronský Bukovec in Slovakia
- Coordinates: 48.84°N 19.38°E
- Country: Slovakia
- Region: Banská Bystrica Region
- District: Banská Bystrica District
- First mentioned: 1563

Government
  - Mayor: Igor Šagát

Area
  - Total: 14.47 km^{2} (5.59 sq mi)
- Elevation: 527 m (1,729 ft)

Population (2025)
  - Total: 122
- Time zone: UTC+1 (CET)
  - Summer (DST): UTC+2 (CEST)
- Postal code: 976 62
- Area code: +421 48
- Vehicle registration plate (until 2022): BB
- Website: www.pohronskybukovec.sk

Pohronský Bukovec (Hungarian: Bukóc) is a village and municipality in Banská Bystrica District in the Banská Bystrica Region of central Slovakia.

== History ==
In historical records the village was first mentioned in 1563.

== Geography ==
The municipality lies at an altitude of 527 metres (1,729 ft) and covers an area of 14.47 km^{2} (5.59 sq mi) (2025).

== Population ==
Population statistic (10 years)
Year	1995	2005	2015	2025
Count	102	85	110	122
Difference		−16.66%	+29.41%	+10.90%

Population statistic
Year	2024	2025
Count	123	122
Difference		−0.81%

It has a population of 122 people (31 December 2025).

=== Ethnicity ===
Census 2021 (1+ %)
Ethnicity	Number	Fraction
Slovak	113	97.41%
Czech	2	1.72%
Total	116	

In year 2021 was 116 people by ethnicity 113 as Slovak, 2 as Czech, 1 as Not found out, 1 as German and 1 as Hungarian.

Note on population: The difference values of population numbers in the table "Population statistic" and in the sections "Ethnicity" & "Religion" is caused by the use of various statistical methods.

=== Religion ===
Census 2021 (1+ %)
Religion	Number	Fraction
Roman Catholic Church	78	67.24%
None	26	22.41%
Evangelical Church	3	2.59%
Christian Congregations in Slovakia	2	1.72%
Total	116	

In year 2021 was 116 people by religion 78 from Roman Catholic Church, 26 from None, 3 from Evangelical Church, 2 from Christian Congregations in Slovakia, 1 from Calvinist Church, 1 from Other and not ascertained christian church, 1 from Jehovah's Witnesses, 1 from Not found out, 1 from Greek Catholic Church, 1 from Buddhism and 1 from Ad hoc movements.
