= Field Army Bernolák =

Field army of the Axis Slovak Republic during World War II

- Poľná armáda Bernolák
- Active: 29 August 1939 – September 1939
- Country: Slovakia
- Branch: Slovak Army
- Size: Field army
- Patron: Anton Bernolák
- Engagements: World War II; Polish campaign

Commanders
- Notable commanders: Ferdinand Catlos

The Field Army Bernolák (Slovak: Poľná armáda Bernolák) was a field army of the Axis Slovak Republic during World War II, established for the Invasion of Poland. It was named after Anton Bernolák, the first codifier of the literary Slovak language.

== History ==
Formed on 29 August 1939, the field army covered the eastern flank of German 14th Army during the invasion of Poland in September 1939.

== Order of battle ==
The army's order of battle for the invasion of Poland in 1939 was as follows:

- Army headquarters (General Ferdinand Čatloš)
- 1st Infantry Division "Janošík" (Gen. Antonin Pulanich)
- 2nd Infantry Division "Škultéty" (Col. Ivan Imro, later Gen. Alexandr Čunderlik)
- 3rd Infantry Division "Razus" (Gen. Augustín Malár)
- Fast Group "Kalinčiak" (Col. Ivan Imro)
- 4th Artillery Regiment
- 51st Artillery Regiment
- Bernolak Armored Train
- Bernolak Telegraph Battalion
- Topol Motorized Battalion
- 2 Independent Infantry Battalions
- Aviation and Air Defense Command
