= Brute Force (Ellis book) =

Book by John Ellis

Brute Force: Allied Strategy and Tactics in the Second World War
- Author: John Ellis
- Language: English
- Subject: World War II
- Genre: Non-fiction
- Publisher: Viking
- Publication date: 1990
- ISBN: 9780670807734

Brute Force: Allied Strategy and Tactics in the Second World War (published 1990) is a book by the historian John Ellis that concludes that the Allied Forces won World War II not by the skill of their leaders, war planners and commanders in the field, but by brute force, which he describes as advantages in firepower and logistics.

Ellis describes what he feels are poor decisions by the Allied High Command with regards to such things as employment of weapons systems or misuses of their overwhelming advantage in manpower. Among his criticisms are the use of tanks in North Africa; the Soviet Union's use of manpower, wasteful bombing strategies, particularly RAF Marshal Sir Arthur Harris's carpet bombing; and the failure to target Japan's shipping lanes. He also points out the similarities between World War II generals like Bernard Law Montgomery and World War I generals like Douglas Haig, particularly the cautious method that both men used to plan battles. The book is noted for its extensive use of statistical background information.
