= Architecture of Slovakia =

The architecture of Slovakia has a long, rich and diverse history. Besides Roman ruins (as in the military camp of Gerulata), Slovakia hosts several Romanesque and Gothic castles and churches, most notably Spiš Castle, which were built at the time of the Kingdom of Hungary. Renaissance architecture was of particular relevance in town hall squares, such as in Bardejov and Levoča. Affluent architecture in the following centuries made use of Baroque, Rococo and historicist styles (neo-classical, neo-Renaissance and neo-Gothic), while vernacular architecture in the countryside developed a specific style of wooden houses and wooden churches. In the 20th century, Slovakia knew Art Nouveau and modernist architecture, including socialist modernism, and finally contemporary architecture.

== Prehistory and Antiquity ==
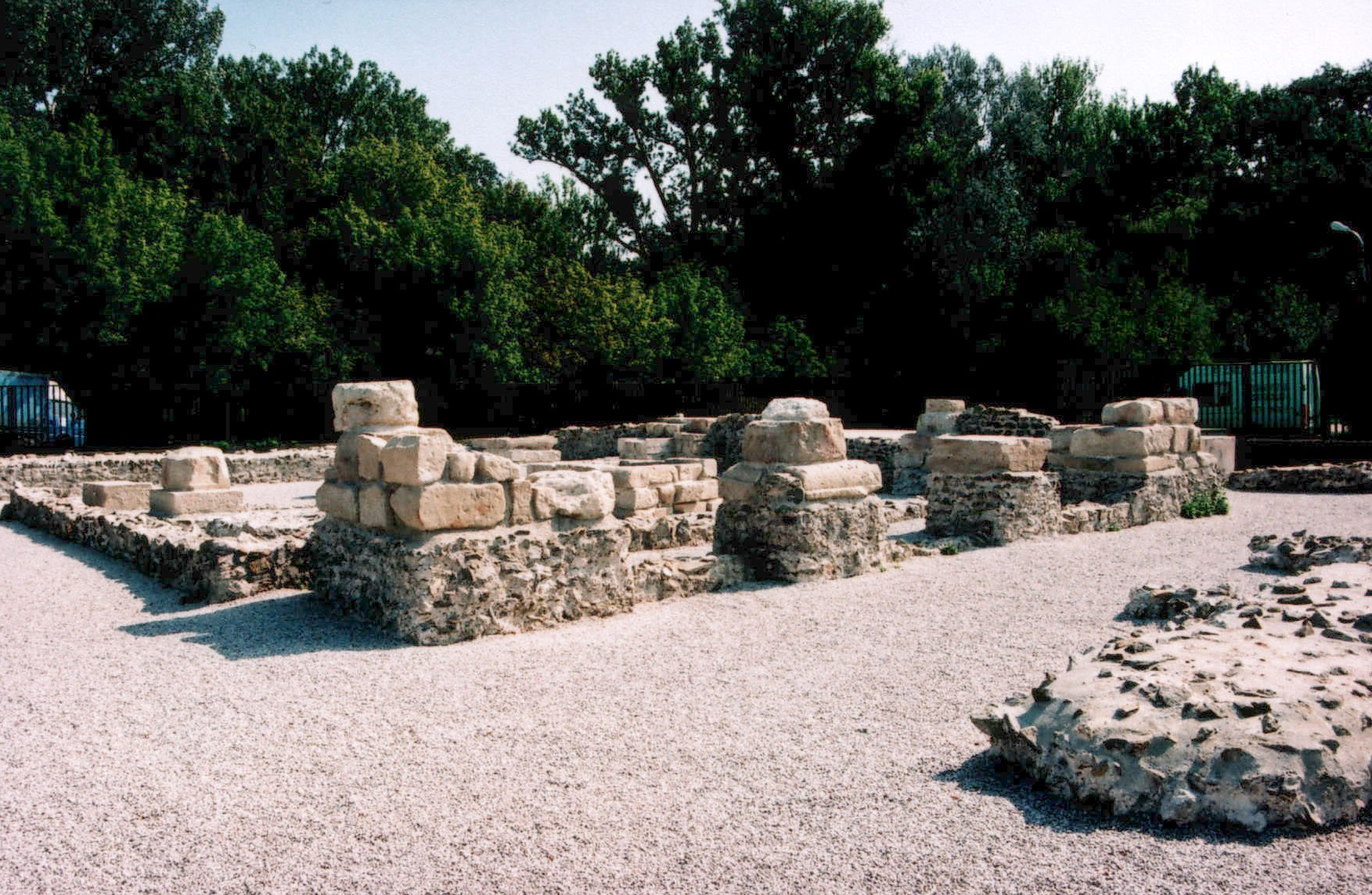
Gerulata

Gerulata was a Roman military camp located near today's Rusovce, a borough of Bratislava, Slovakia. It was part of the Roman province of Pannonia and was built in the 2nd century as a part of the frontier defence system. It was abandoned in the 4th century, when Roman legions withdrew from Pannonia. Beyond the remains of the Roman forum, fragments of structures and gravestones, bronze, iron, ceramic and stone pieces are on show in a museum showing daily life. The best preserved object is a quadrilateral building 30 metres long and 30 metres wide, with 2.4 metre thick walls.

== Romanesque architecture ==
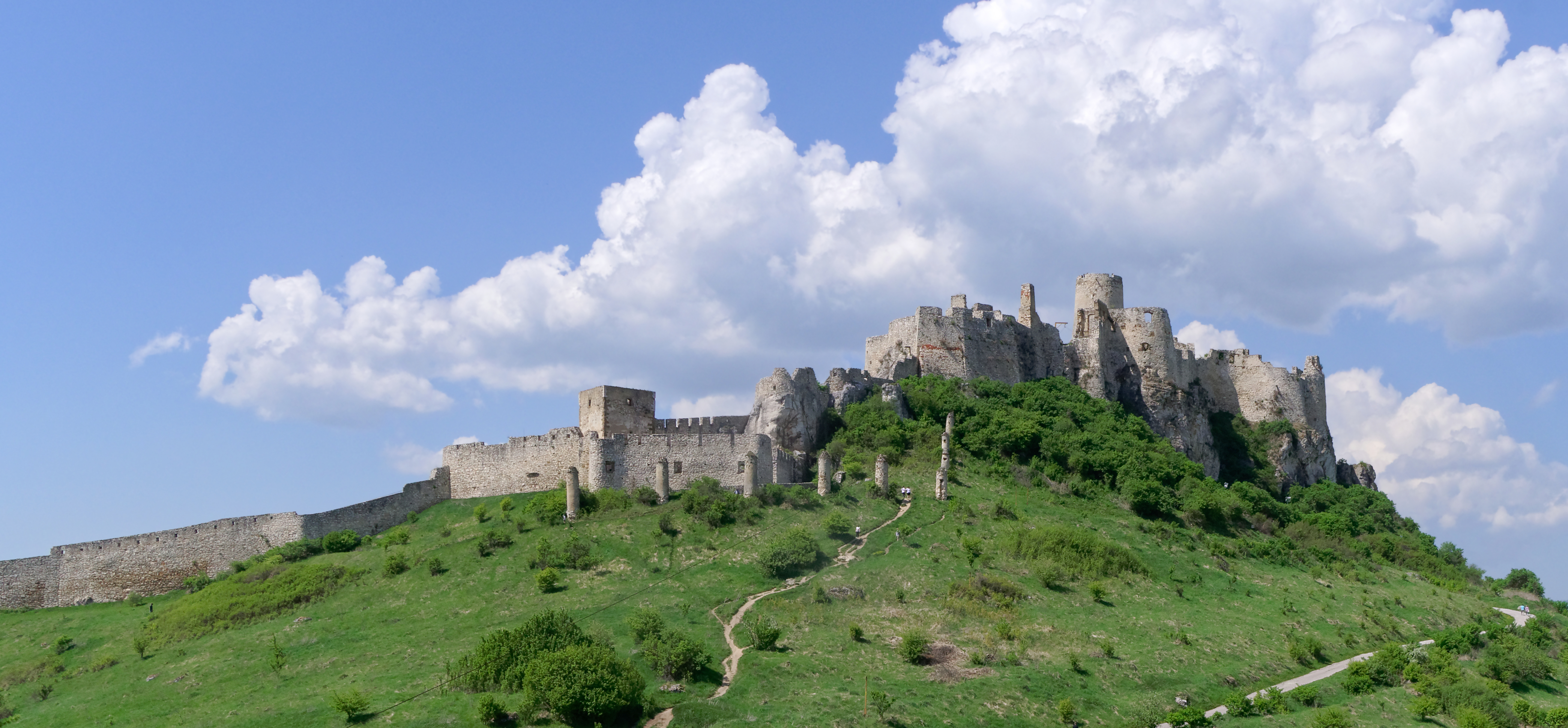
Spiš Castle

Castles from the High Middle Ages still dot the hilltops of Slovakia. The most outstanding is Spiš Castle, in eastern Slovakia, dating from 1209.

Among the oldest churches in Slovakia are:

- The Church of Saint Margaret of Antioch, Kopčany, one of the oldest churches in Slovakia, a pre-Romanesque building for which Greater Moravian origin is considered. The church was built probably in the 9th or 10th century and was first mentioned in 1329.
- The Church of St. Michael the Archangel in Dražovce (Nitra), a typical early Romanesque architecture single nave building with thick enclosure walls and small roundish apse, dating to the 11th century.

Only a handful of Romanesque buildings have been preserved in Slovakia, but these include at least three church monuments of high standing, included in the TransRomanica network:

- Provostry and Cathedral of St.Martin at Spišská Kapitula (Spišské Podhradie): the cathedral was built in the early 13th century for the bishop of the Spiš region, back then an important cultural and economic centre. The three-nave church features a façade with Romanesque towers in alternated sandstone and white travertine. Since 1993, Spišská Kapitula is included in the UNESCO World Heritage List.
- Church of the assumption of the Virgin Mary, Bíňa: around 1217 the Hont-Pázmány noble family founded a monastery in this small village by the river Hron, in the Danube lowlands, including a monumental Romanesque monastery church, which is what remains to date. Designed along the lines of the Esztergom Cathedral, it is a single-nave church with a two-towered façade and a built-out entrance hall. Nearby stands also a Romanesque rotunda dedicated to the twelve apostles, with traces of murals.
- Church of the assumption of the Virgin Mary, Diakovce: an example of Romanesque brick architecture typical of south-east Slovakia, this two-story church (built in 1228) used to be part of a Benedictine abbey established in the 11th century by the Pannonhalma monks. The three-nave church features two towers flanking the façade and three chancels by the apse, where a fragment of a Romanesque fresco still shows Christ in a mandorla. The façades include friezed pilasters.
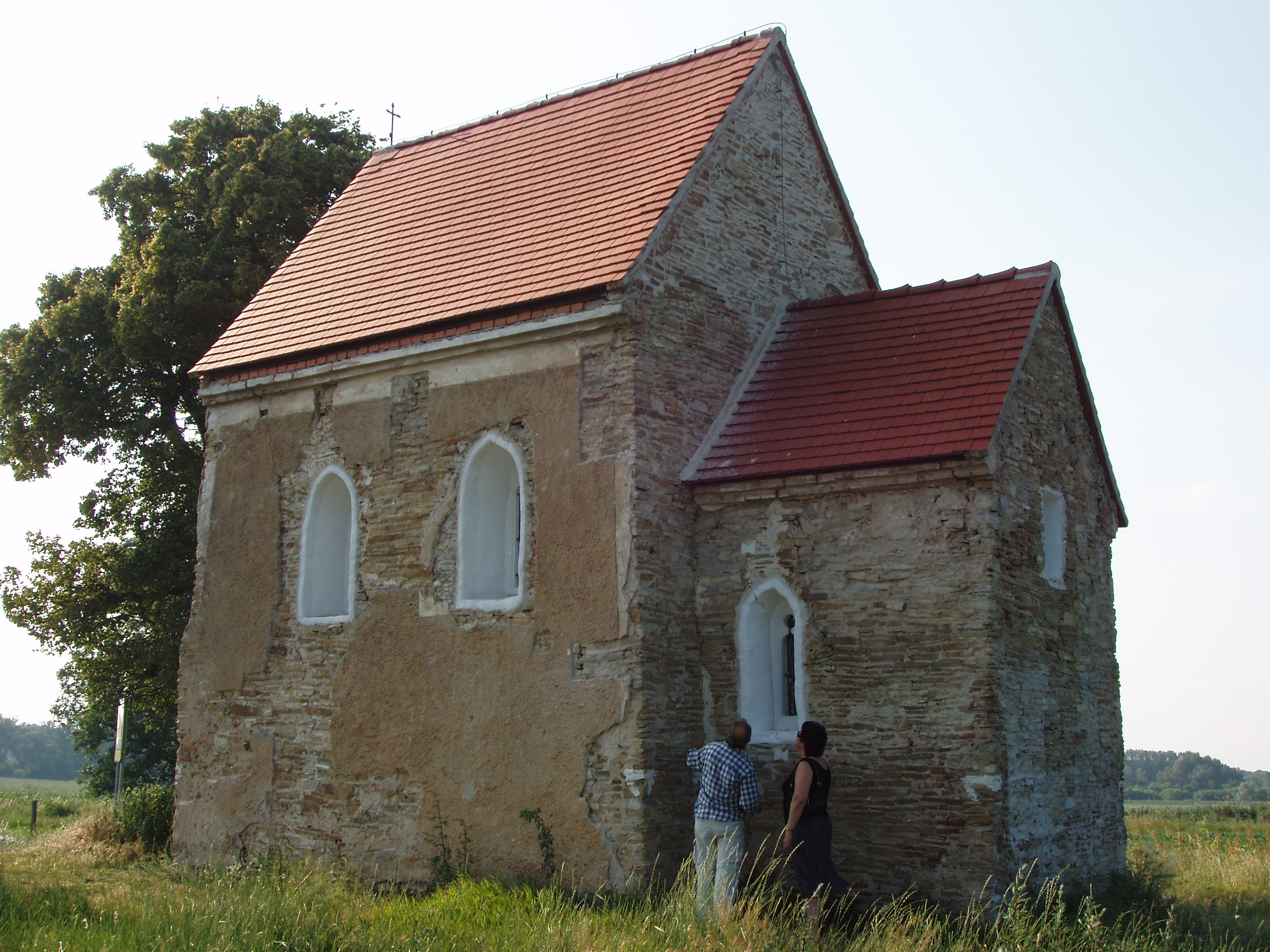
Church of Saint Margaret of Antioch, Kopčany, one of still standing churches for which Greater Moravian origin is considered. 9th or 10th century.

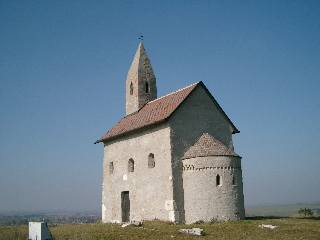
Dražovce church, 11th century

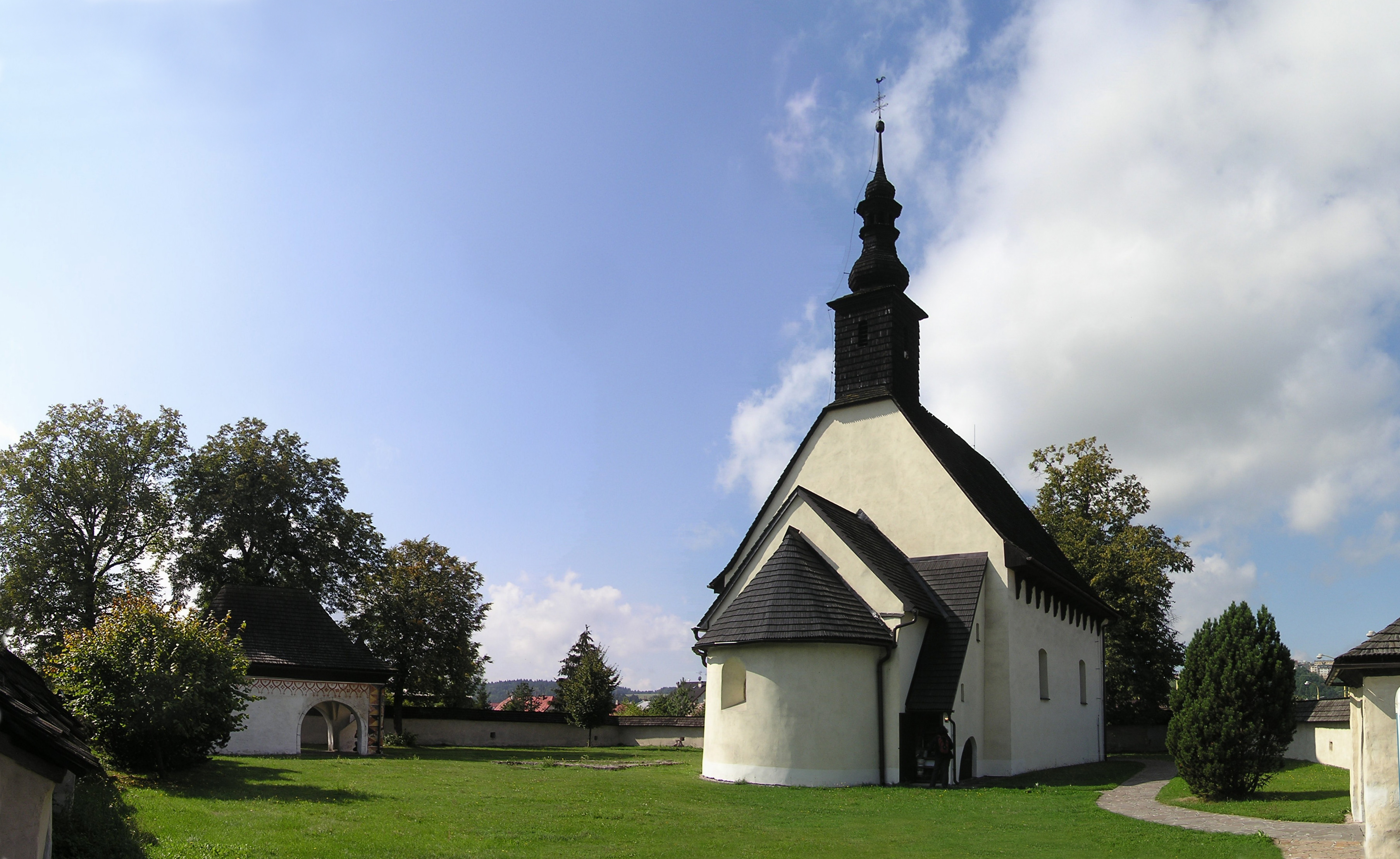
Church of Saint Stephen the King, the oldest extant historical building in Žilina

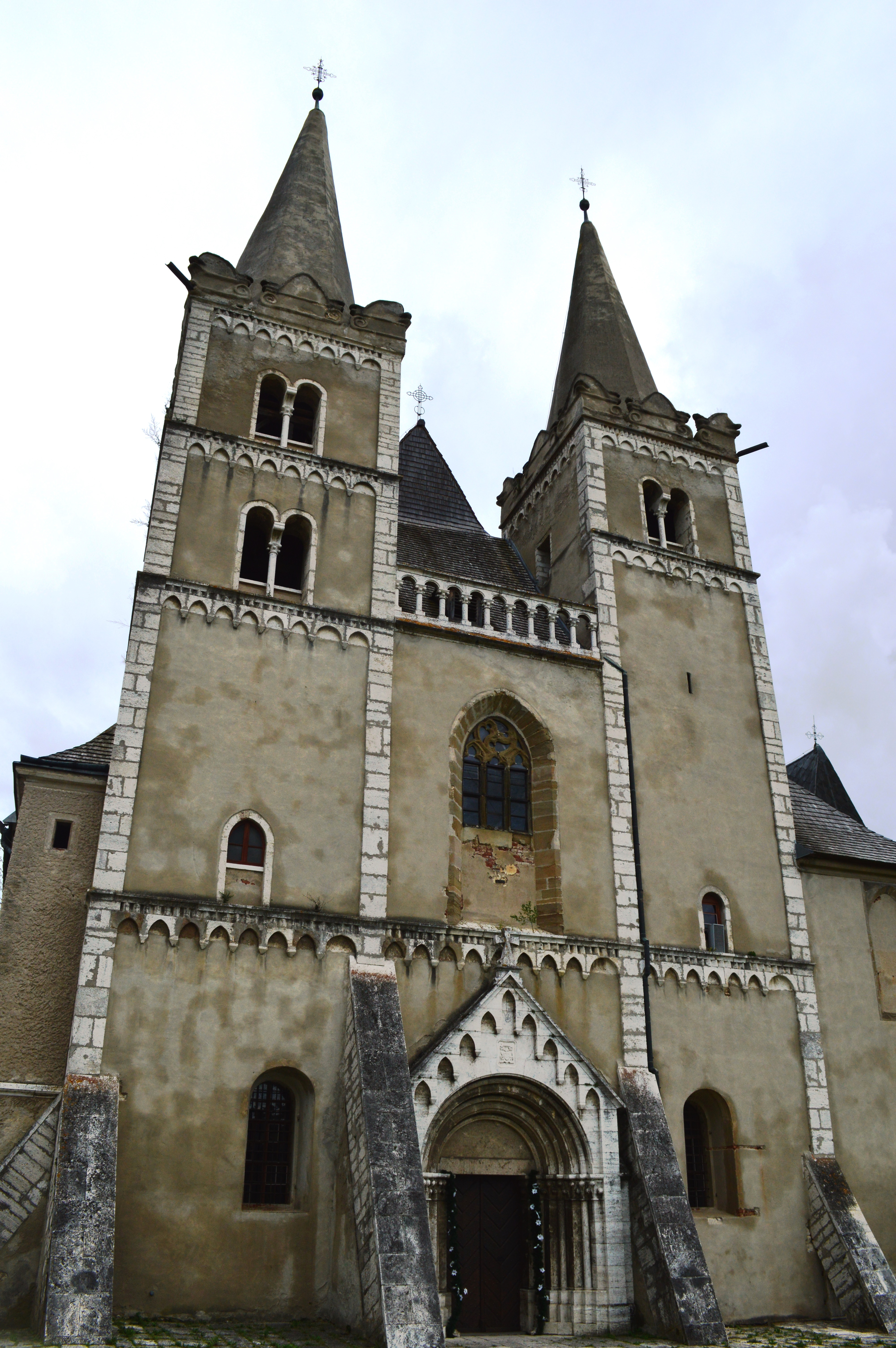
Cathedral of St.Martin at Spišská Kapitula

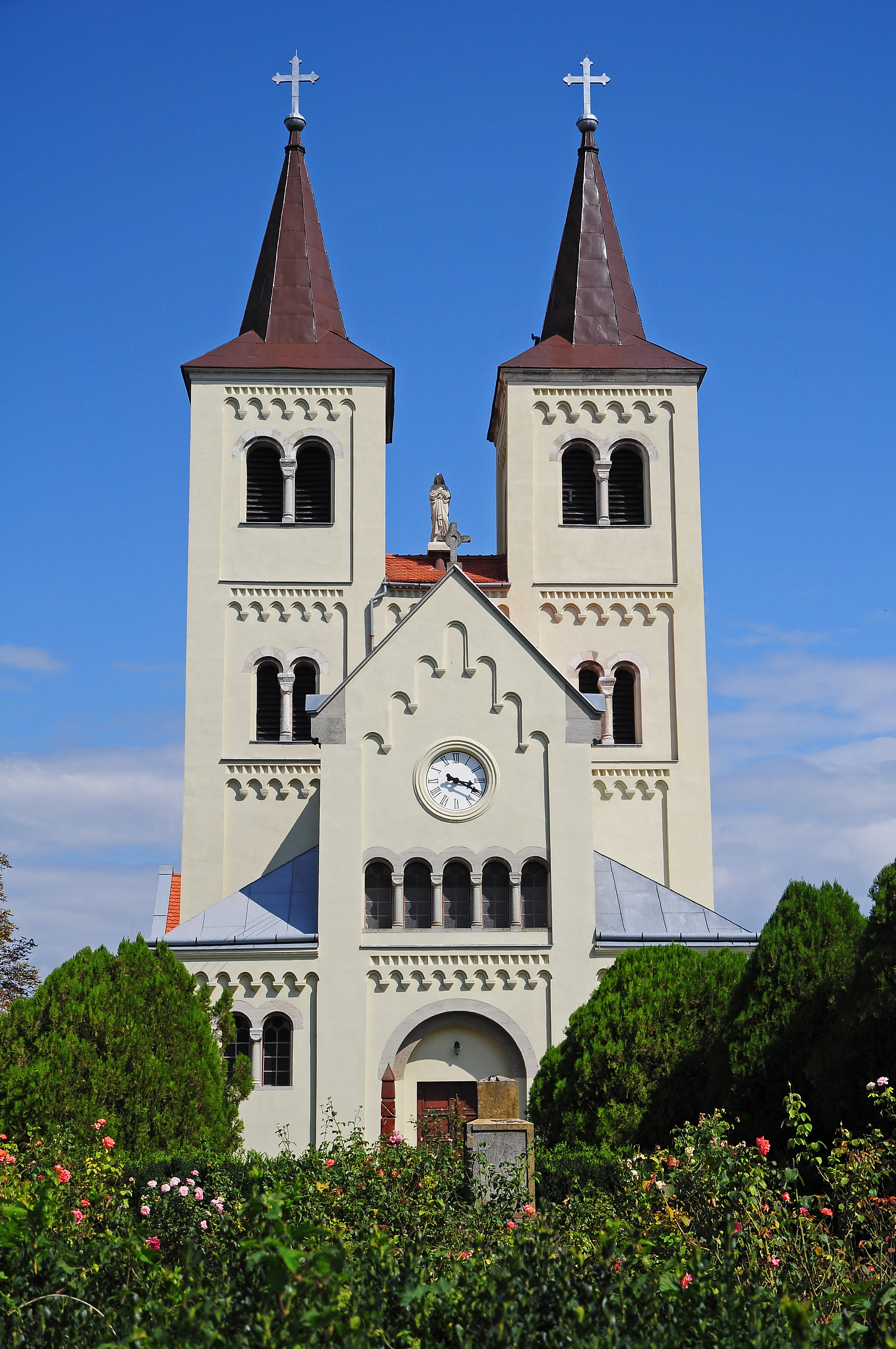
Church of the assumption of the Virgin Mary, Bíňa

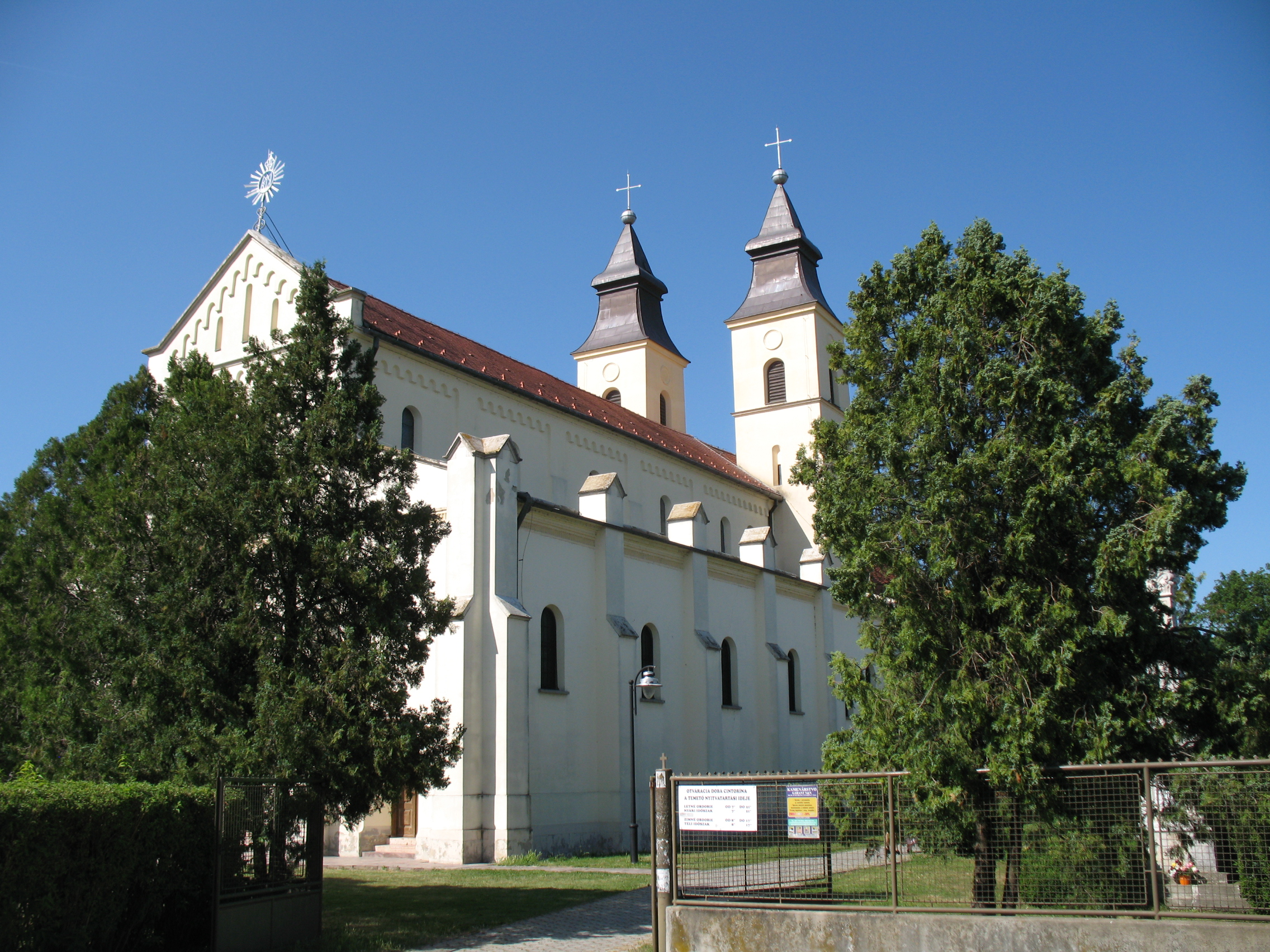
Church of the assumption of the Virgin Mary, Diakovce

== Gothic architecture ==
Castles from the High Middle Ages still dot the hilltops of Slovakia. The most outstanding is Spiš Castle, in eastern Slovakia, dating from 1209. Other castles, listed in the National Cultural Heritage list of the Monuments Board of the Slovak Republic, include:

- Brekov Castle (Brekovský hrad / Barkó vára), near Zemplín, dating back to the second half of the 13th century;
- Jasenov Castle (Jasenovský hrad / Jeszenő vára), near Zemplín, from the late 13th century;
- Šariš Castle (Šarišský hrad / Sáros vára), above the town of Veľký Šariš;
- Zborov Castle (Zborovský hrad / Zboró vára), in Bardejov District, from the 13th century.
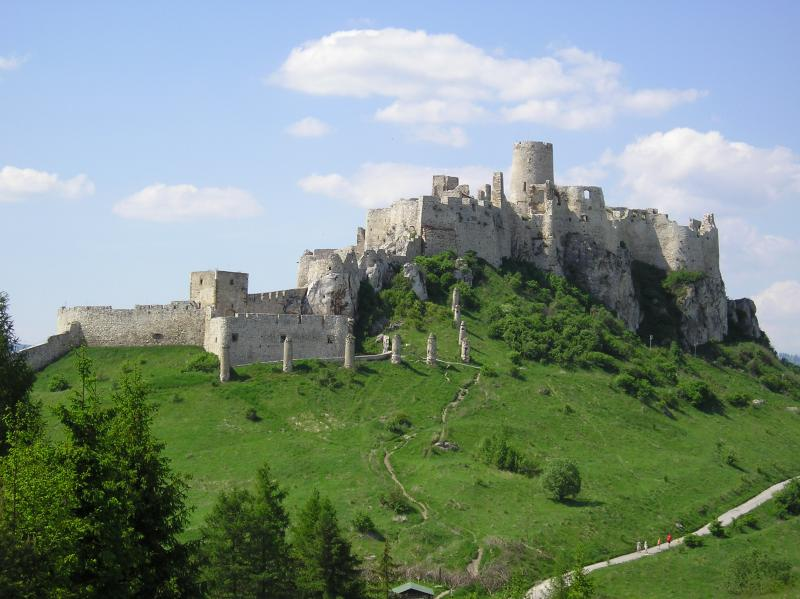
Spiš Castle

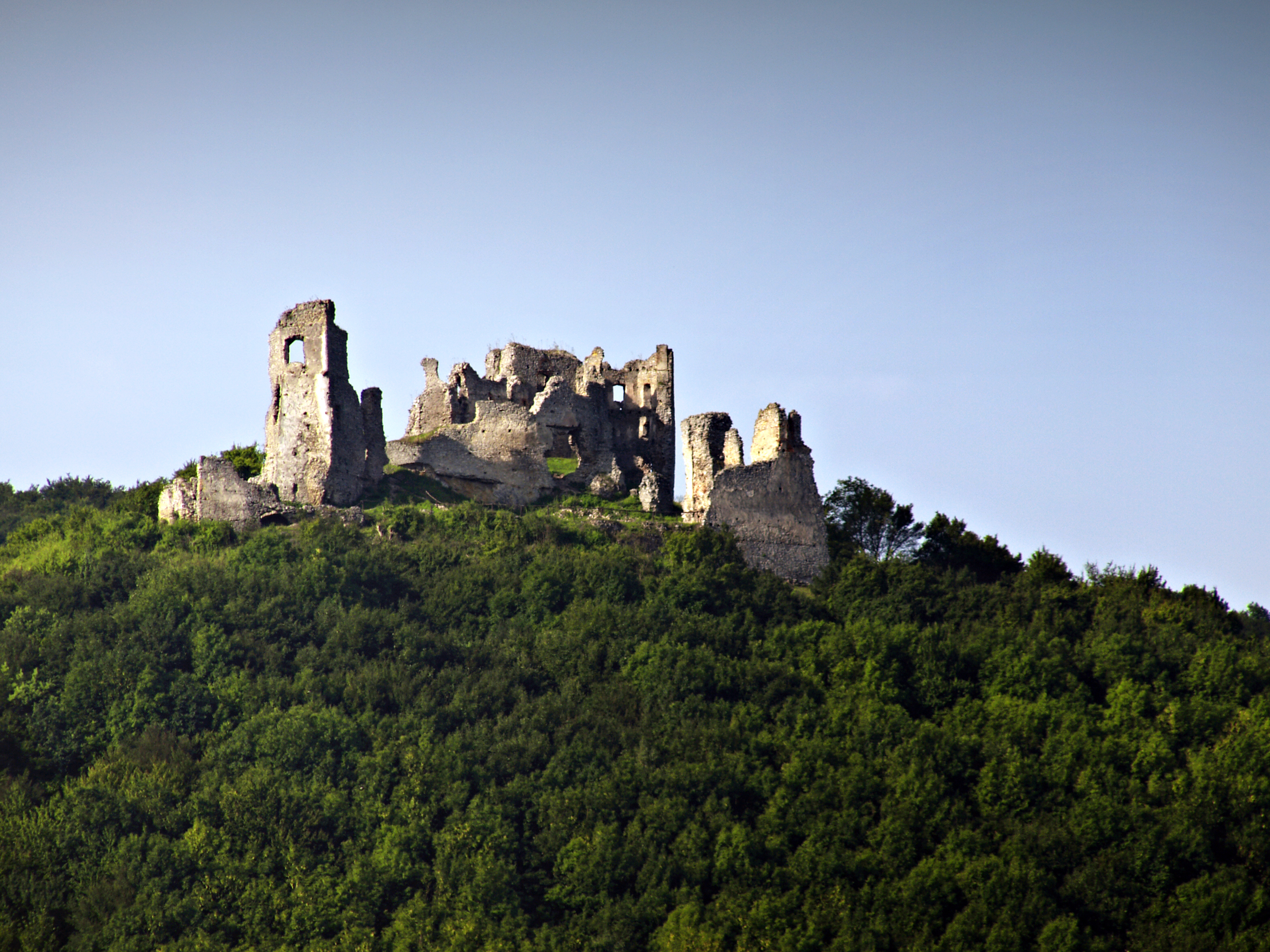
Brekov Castle

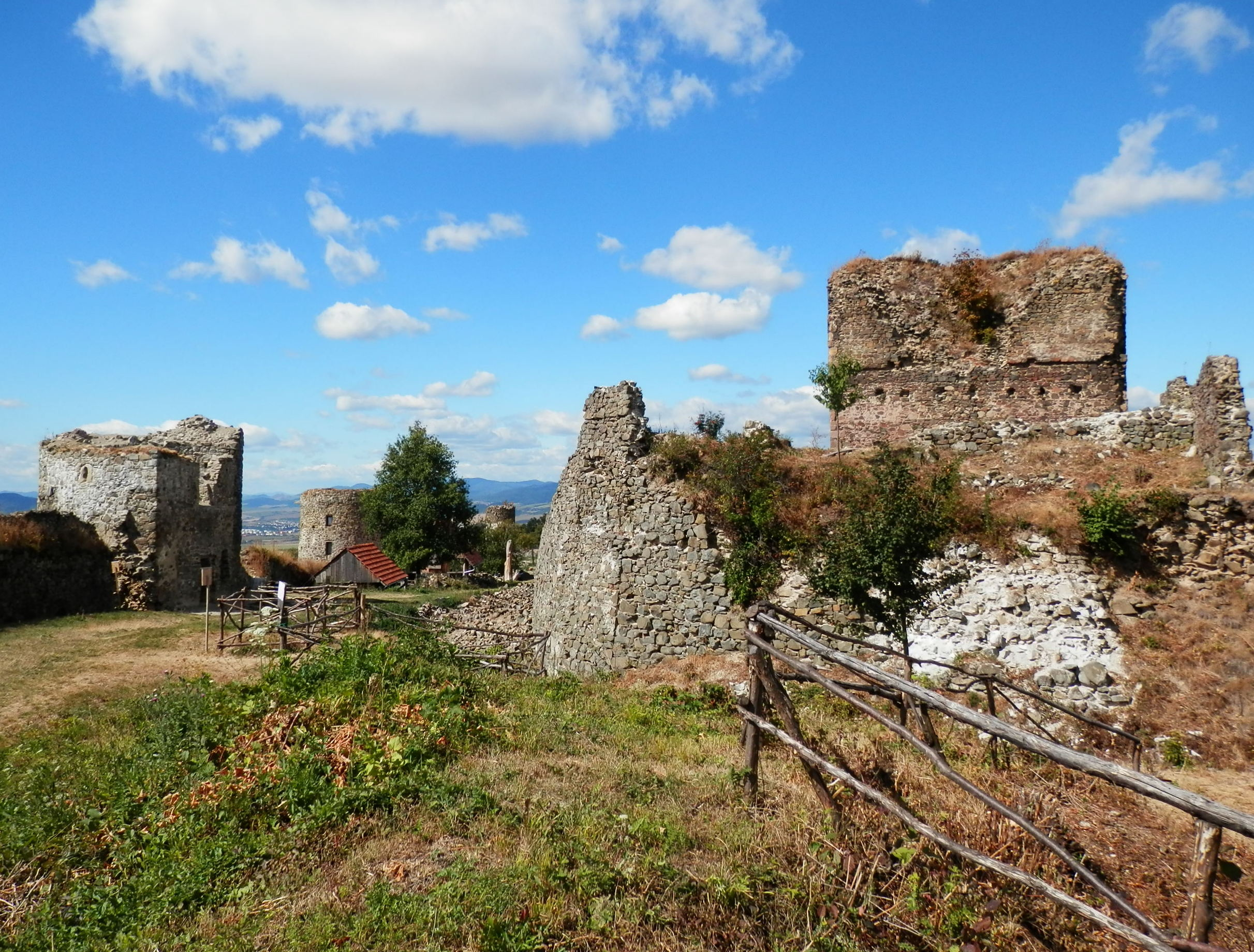
Šariš Castle

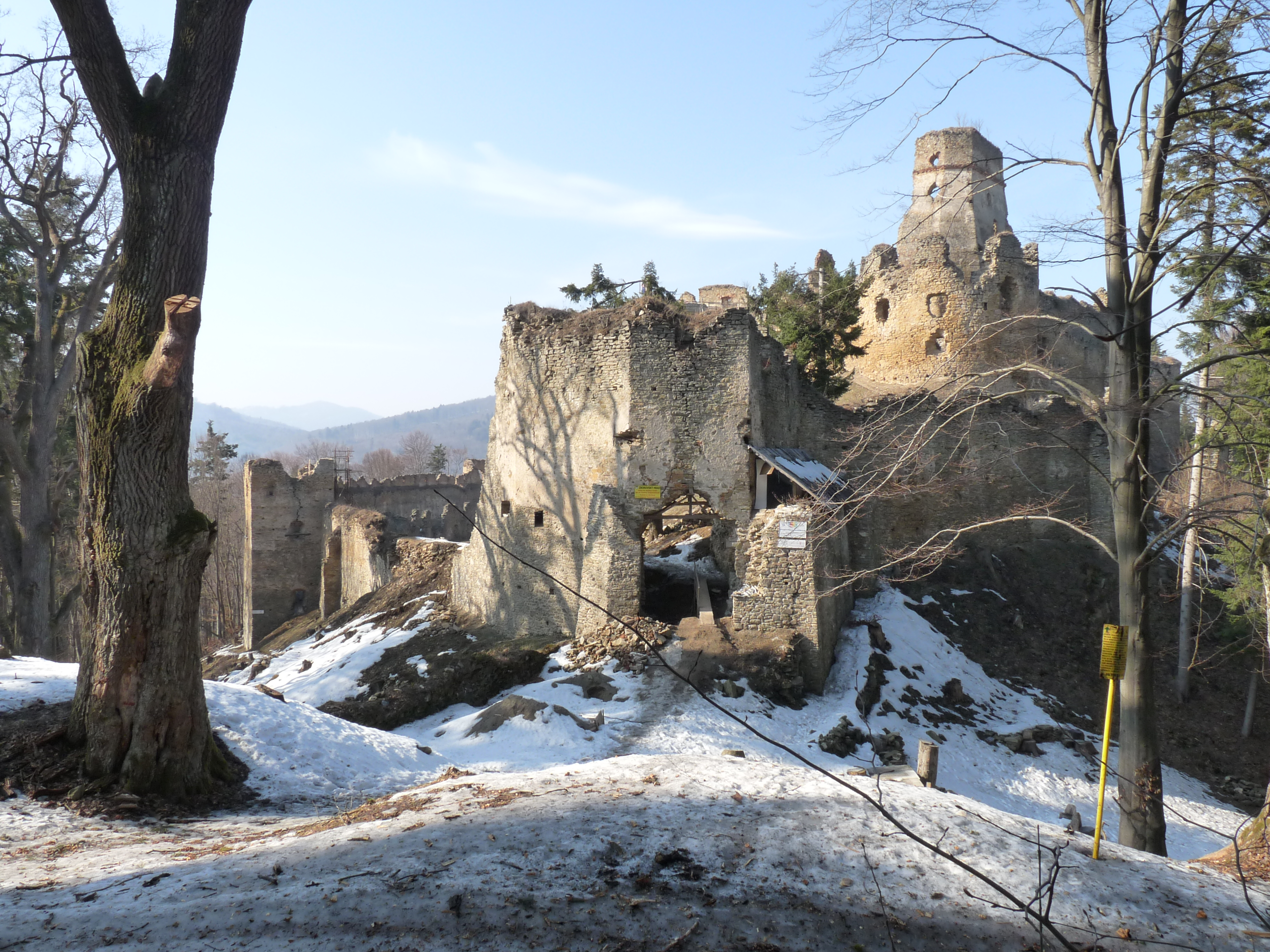
Zborov Castle

Slovakia features several examples of ecclesiastic Gothic. These include:

- the Basilica of St Giles in Bardejov, from the mid-13th century;
- the Clarissine Church in Bratislava, started in 1297;
- Co-Cathedral of Saint Nicholas, Prešov, from the 14th century;
- the huge St Elisabeth Cathedral in Košice, built in 1378–1508
- St Martin's Cathedral, Bratislava, consecrated 1452;
- the Basilica of St James in Levoča;
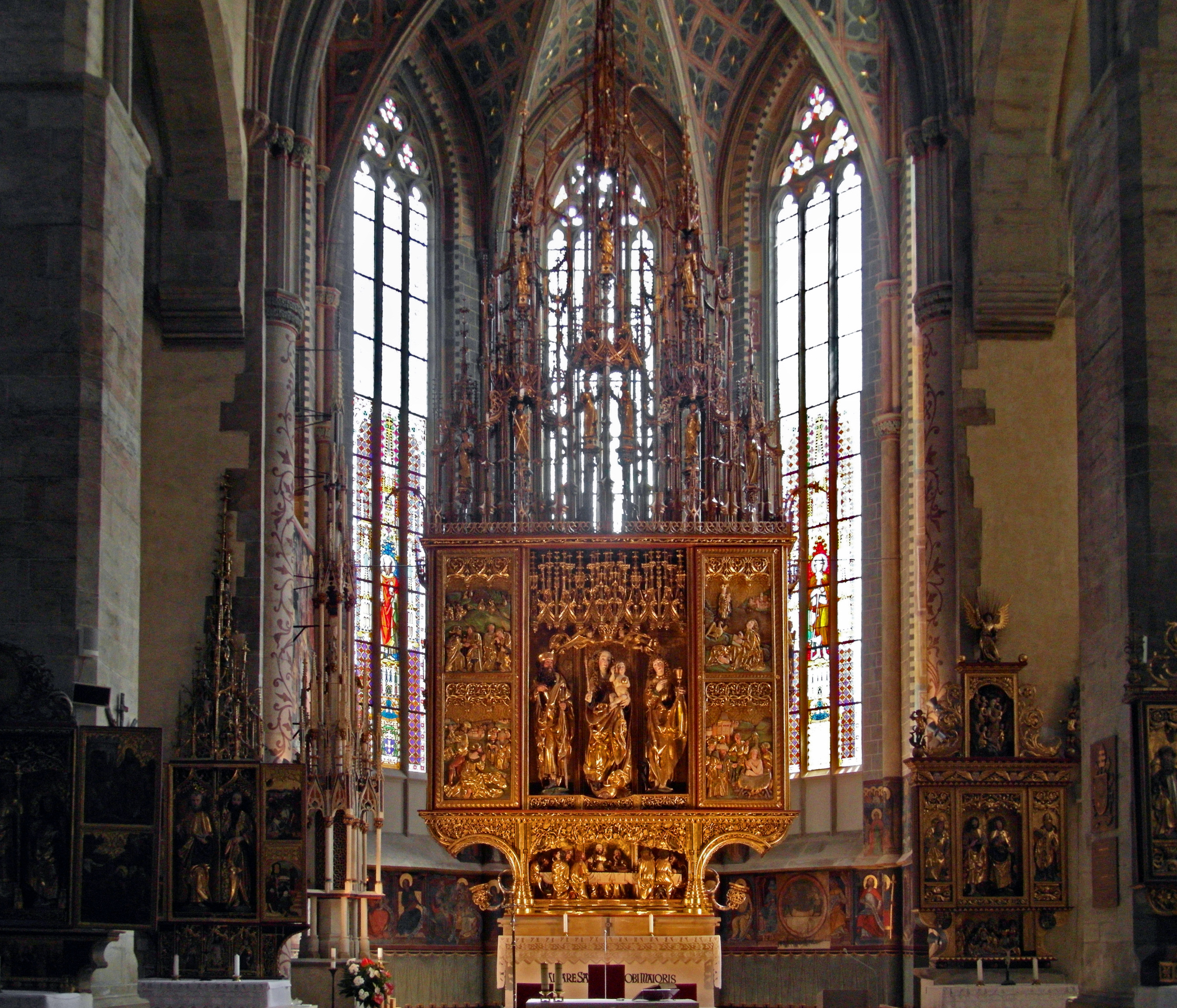
Main altar in Basilica of St. James from the workshop of Master Paul of Levoča, highest wooden altar in the world, 1517

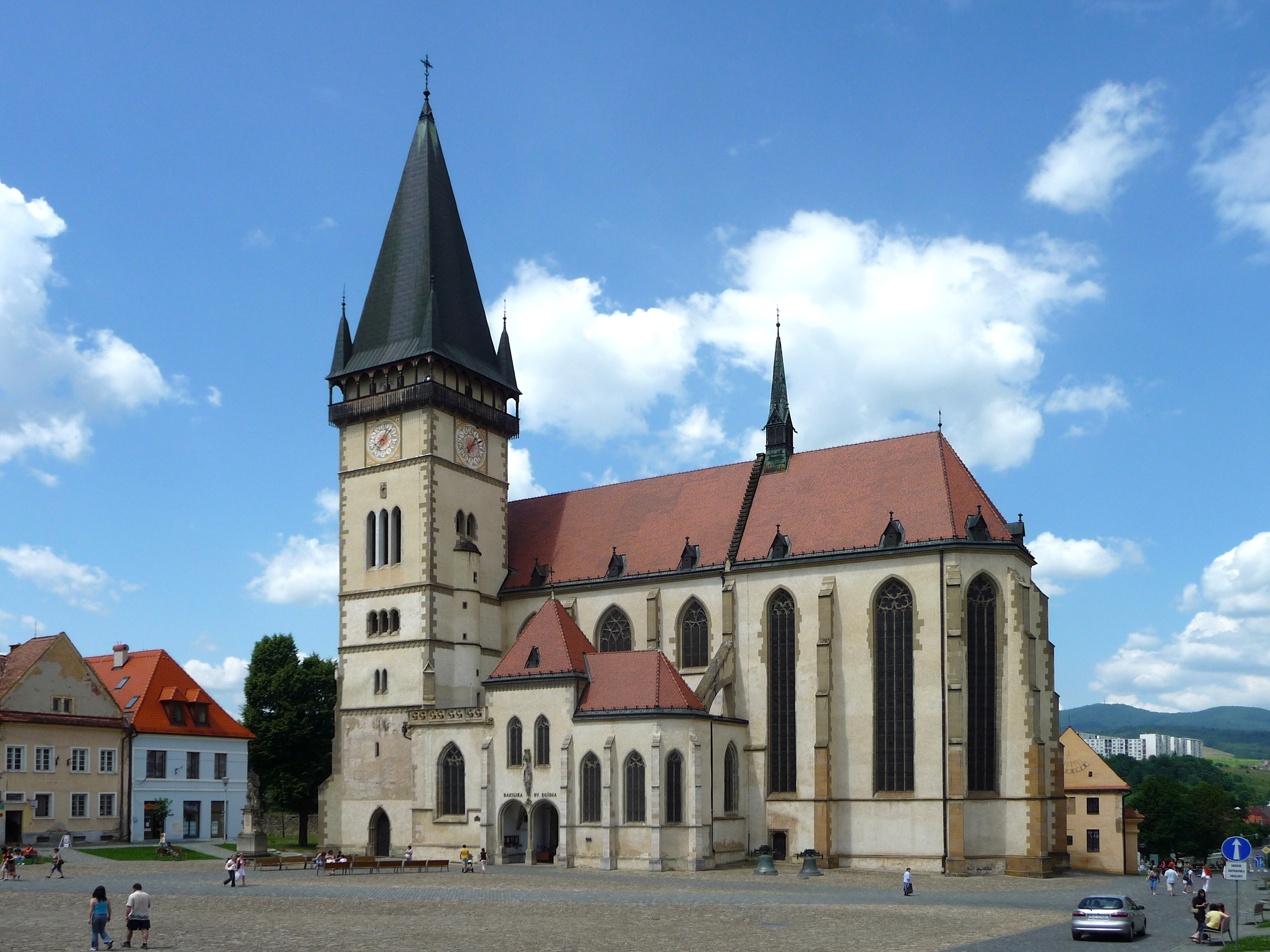
Basilica of St Giles in Bardejov

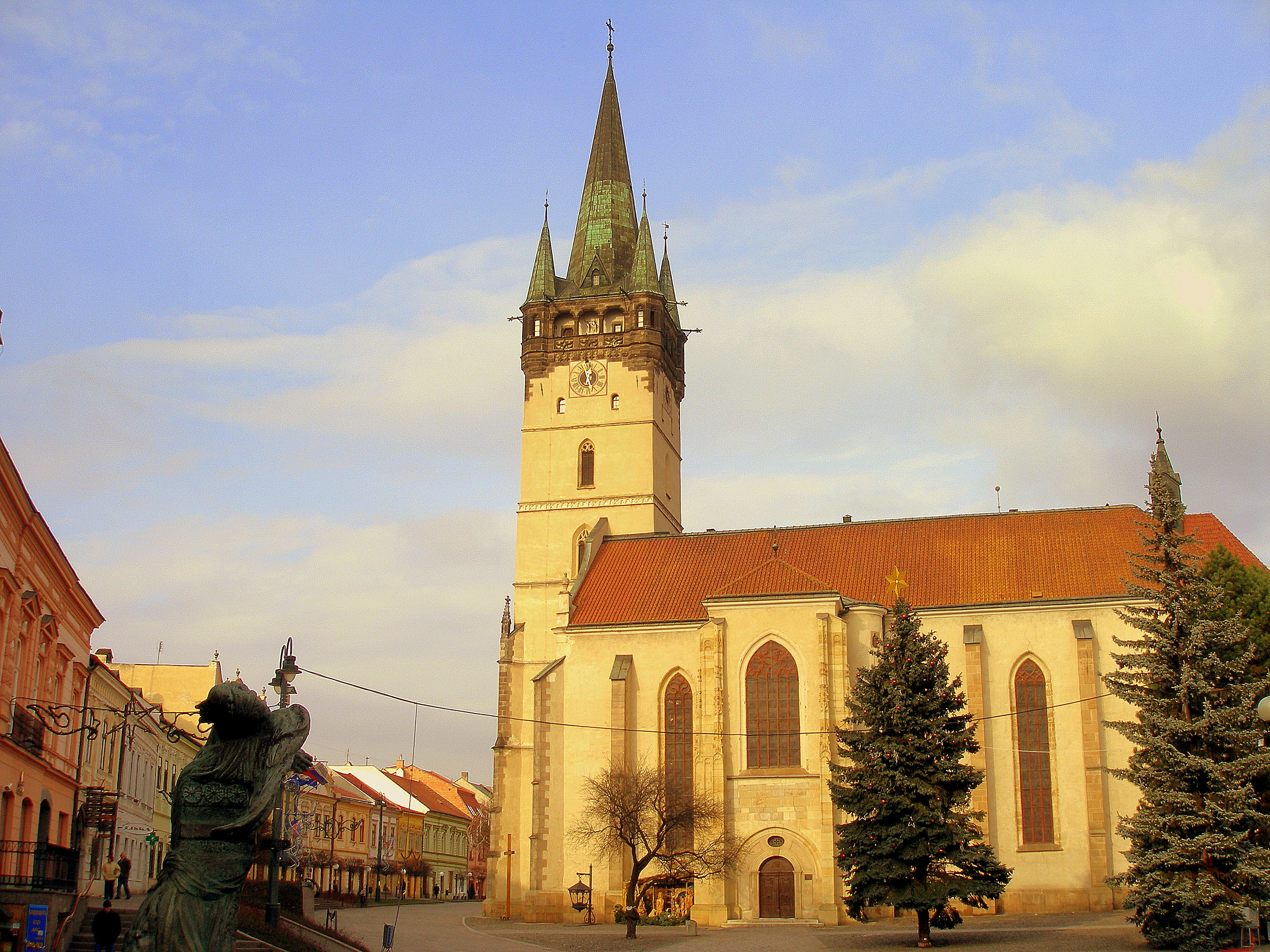
Co-Cathedral of Saint Nicholas, Prešov

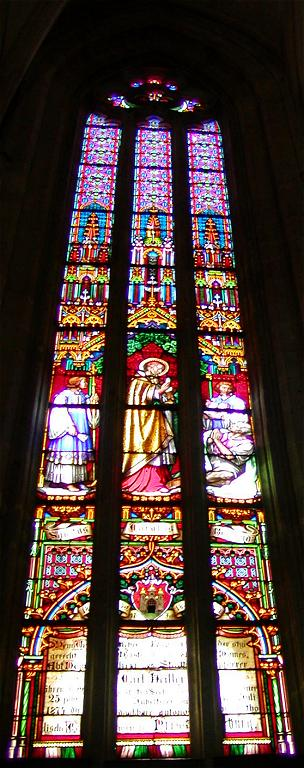
Window of St Martin's Cathedral, Bratislava

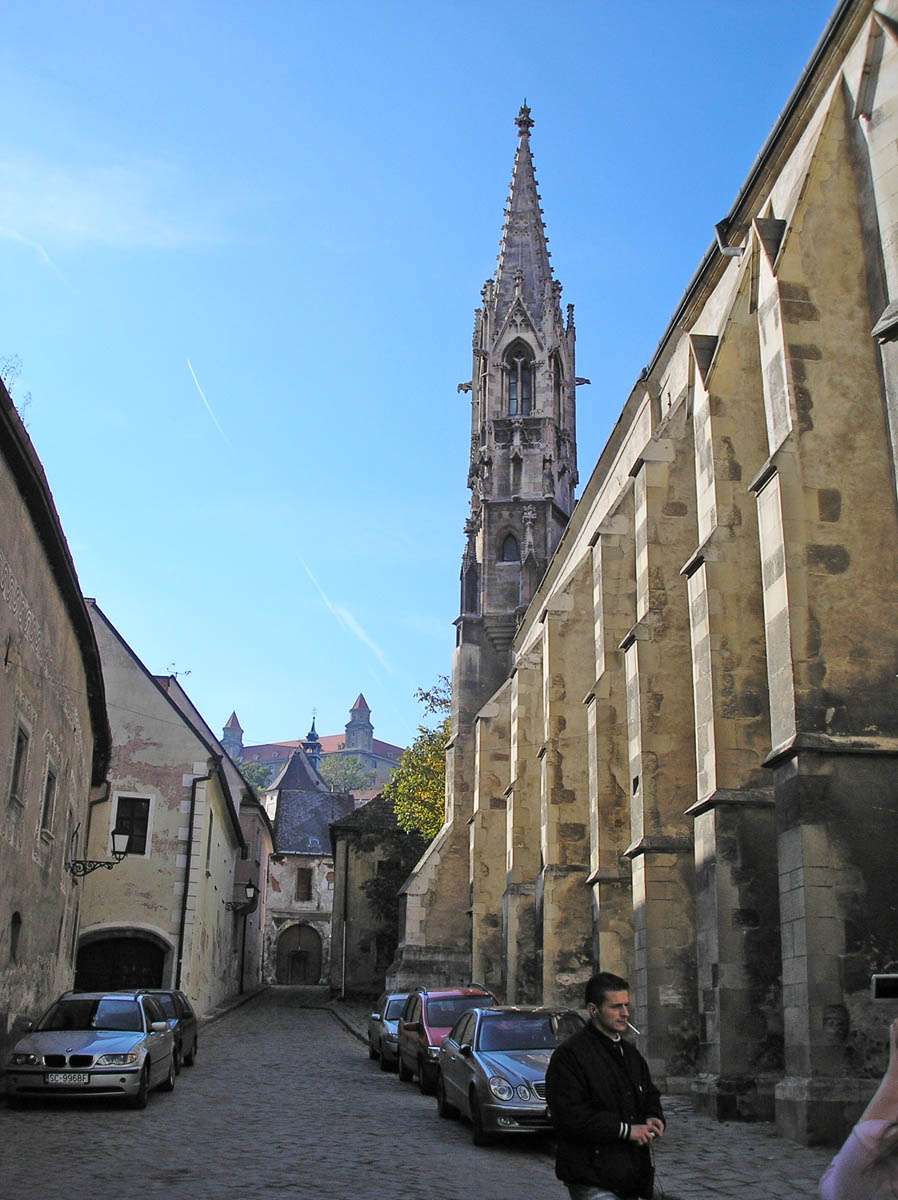
Clarissine Church (Bratislava)

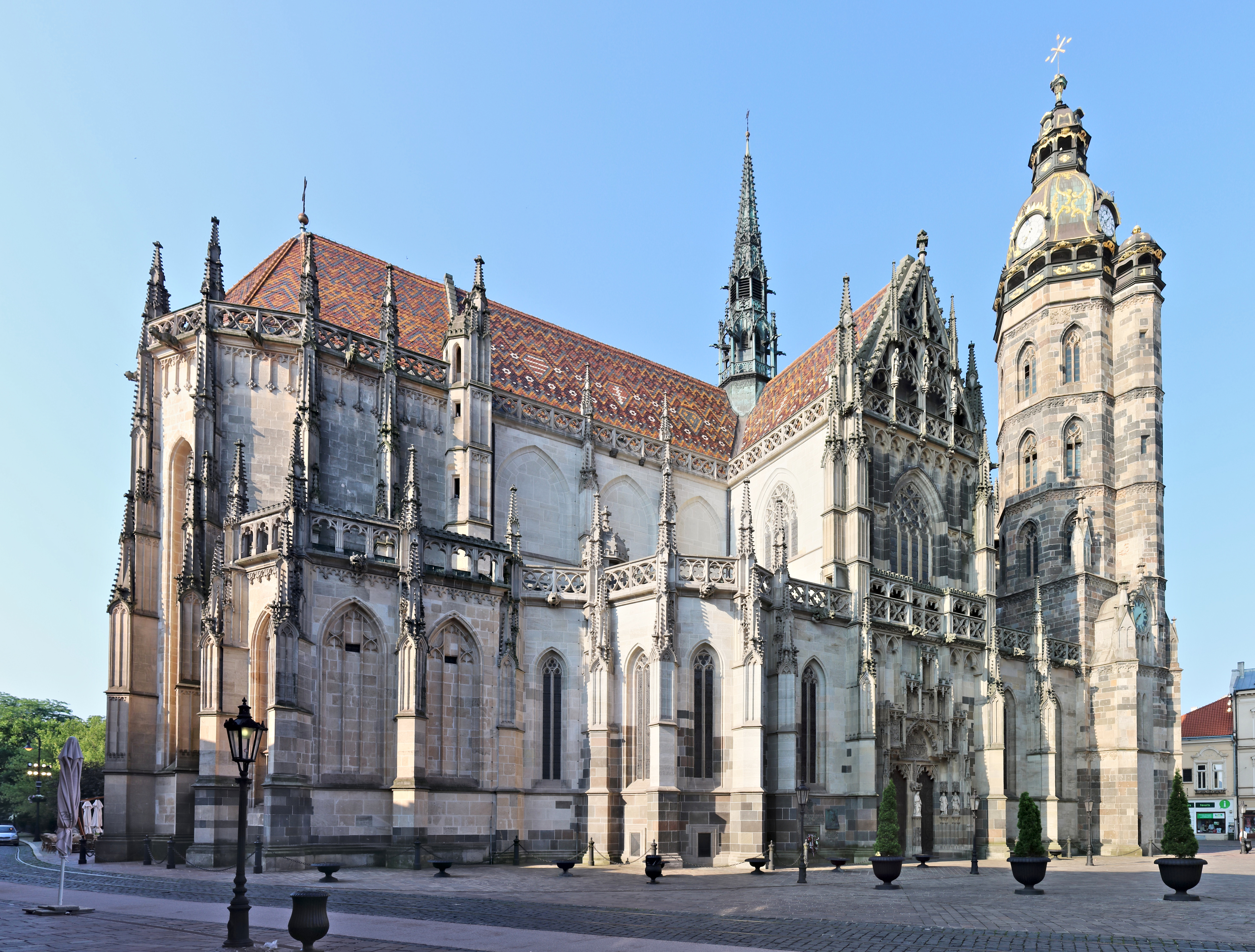
St Elisabeth Cathedral, Košice

== Renaissance architecture ==
Old Slovak town squares used to feature Gothic burgher houses, most of which were remade with Italian-style Renaissance façades in the 16th century, covered with sgraffito decorations. Among them is the town square of Bardejov, a Unesco centre, as well as Levoča.

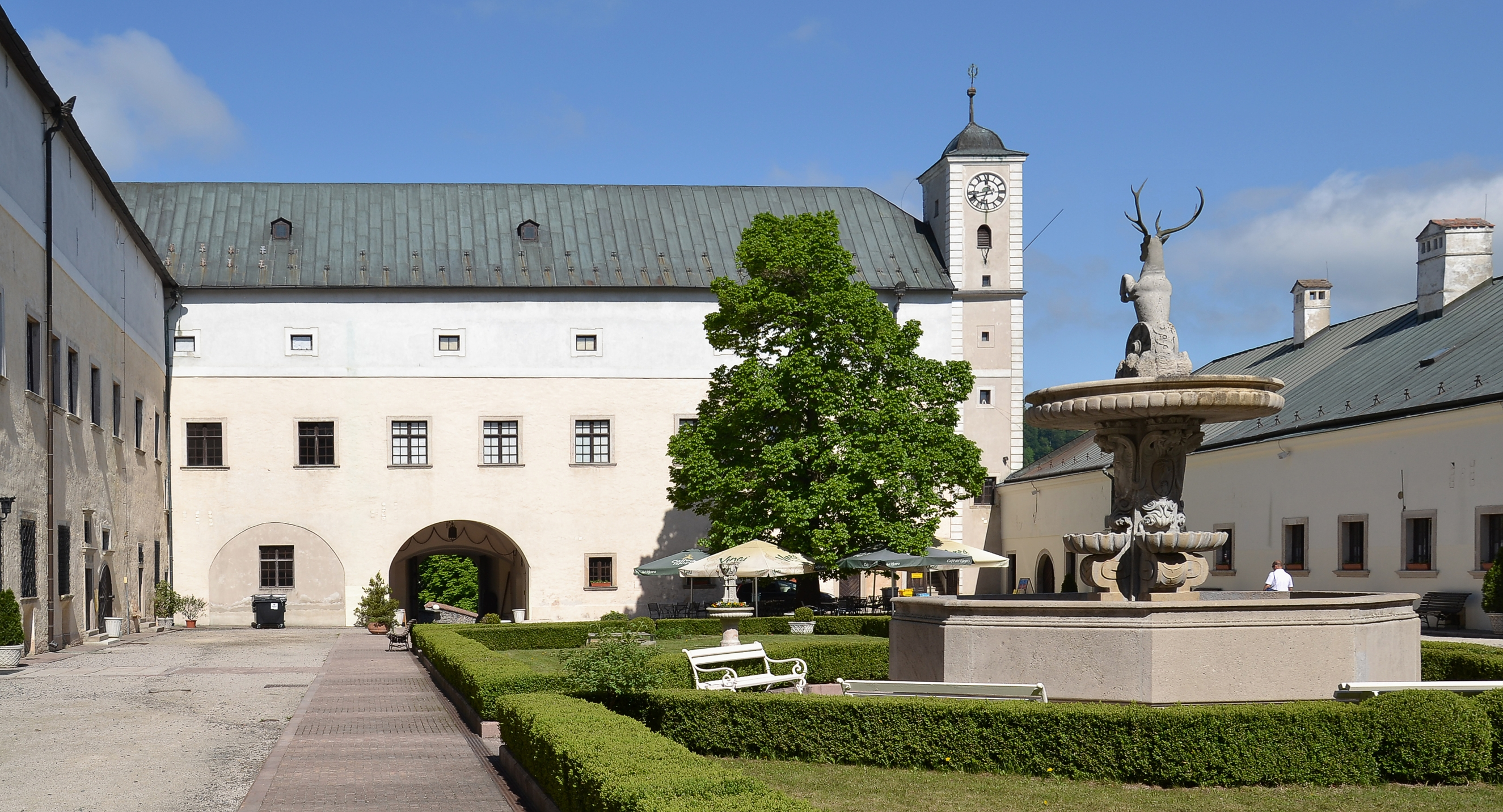
Červený Kameň Castle

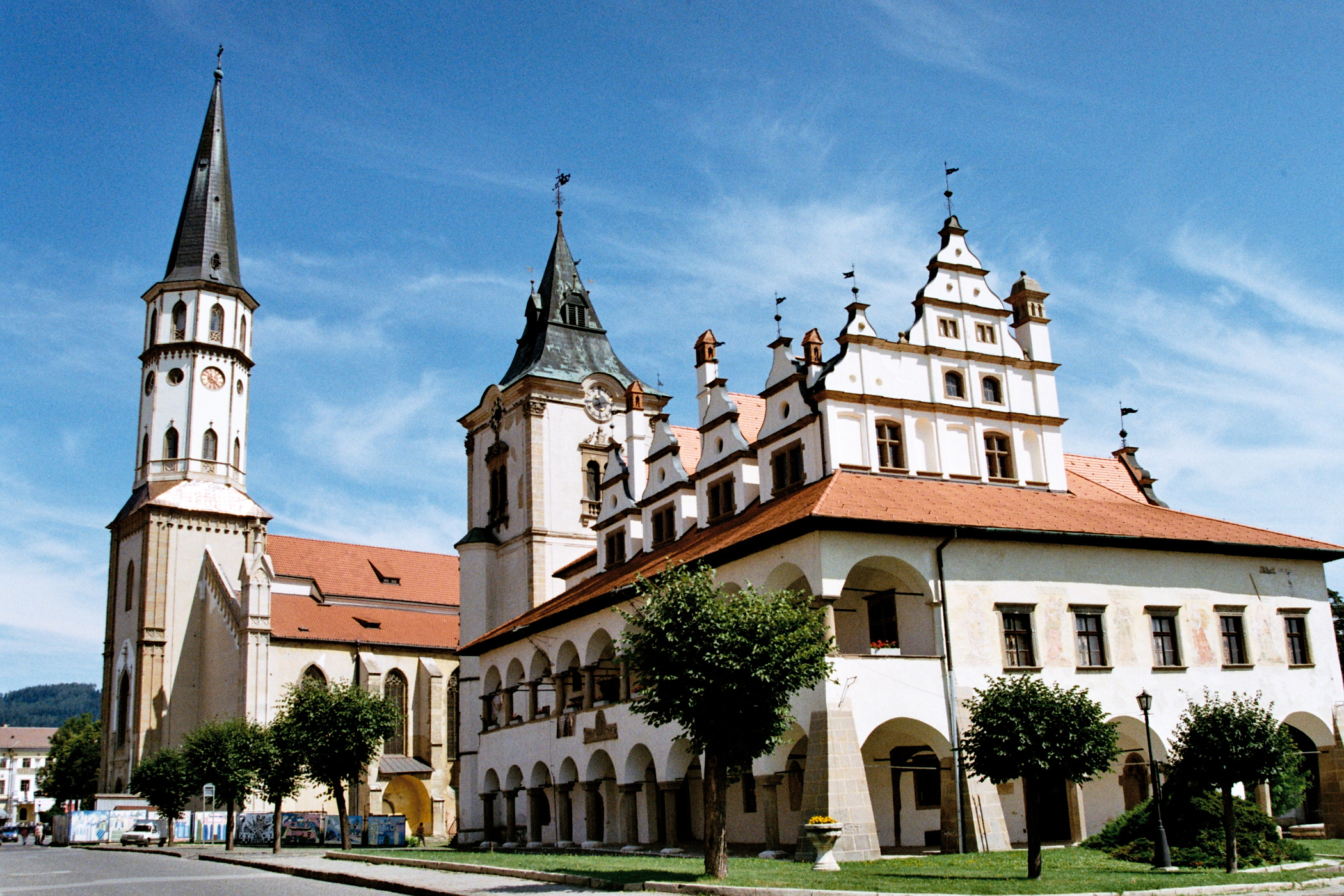
Old Town Hall (Levoča)

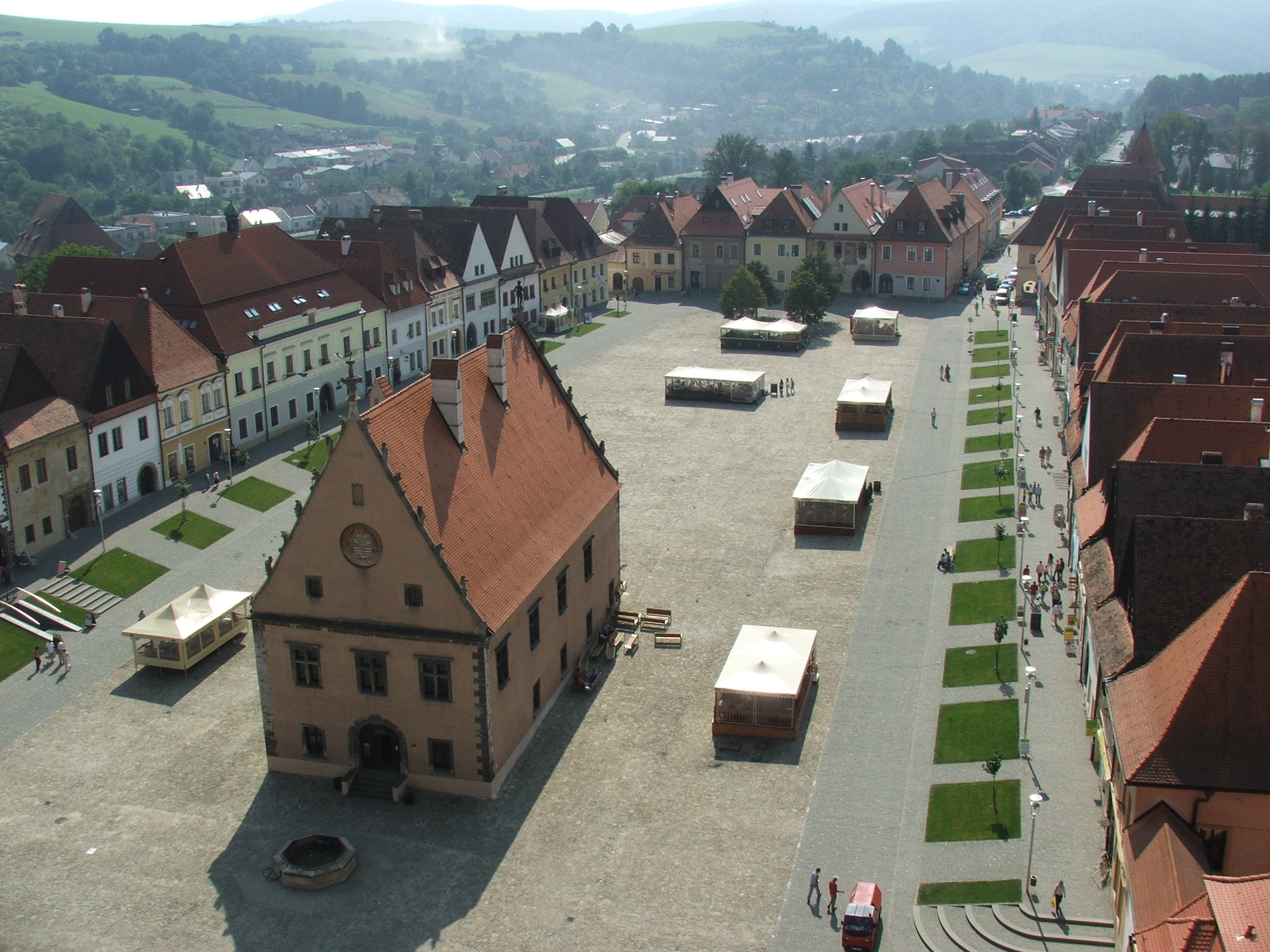
The Town Hall Square (Radničné námestie) in Bardejov

== Folk and vernacular styles ==
Folk and vernacular architecture from Slovak villages remains preserved in several instances. This architectural style typically features wooden structures, sometimes plastered, dating back to the 18th century.

- Čičmany contains a folk architecture reserve, which was founded in 1977. Timbered houses with ridge roofs, galleries and pointed or linear wall decorations have been preserved in Čičmany. Of particular interest are the very specific white patterns which are painted on the exterior walls of the houses to decorate them.
- Vlkolínec, situated in the centre of Slovakia, is a remarkably intact settlement, listed as a UNESCO World Heritage site since 1993. It is the region's most complete group of these kinds of traditional log houses, often found in mountainous areas. The village consists of more than 45 log houses each of them made up of two or three rooms. A wooden belfry from the 18th century as well as the baroque chapel has also been preserved.

Eastern Slovakia is particularly renowned for its wooden churches, often built without nails, dating from the 18th till the 20th century and mainly belonging to Greek Catholic and Orthodox confessions, particularly of the Rusyn minority. They can be found in the area of Bardejov and Snina.

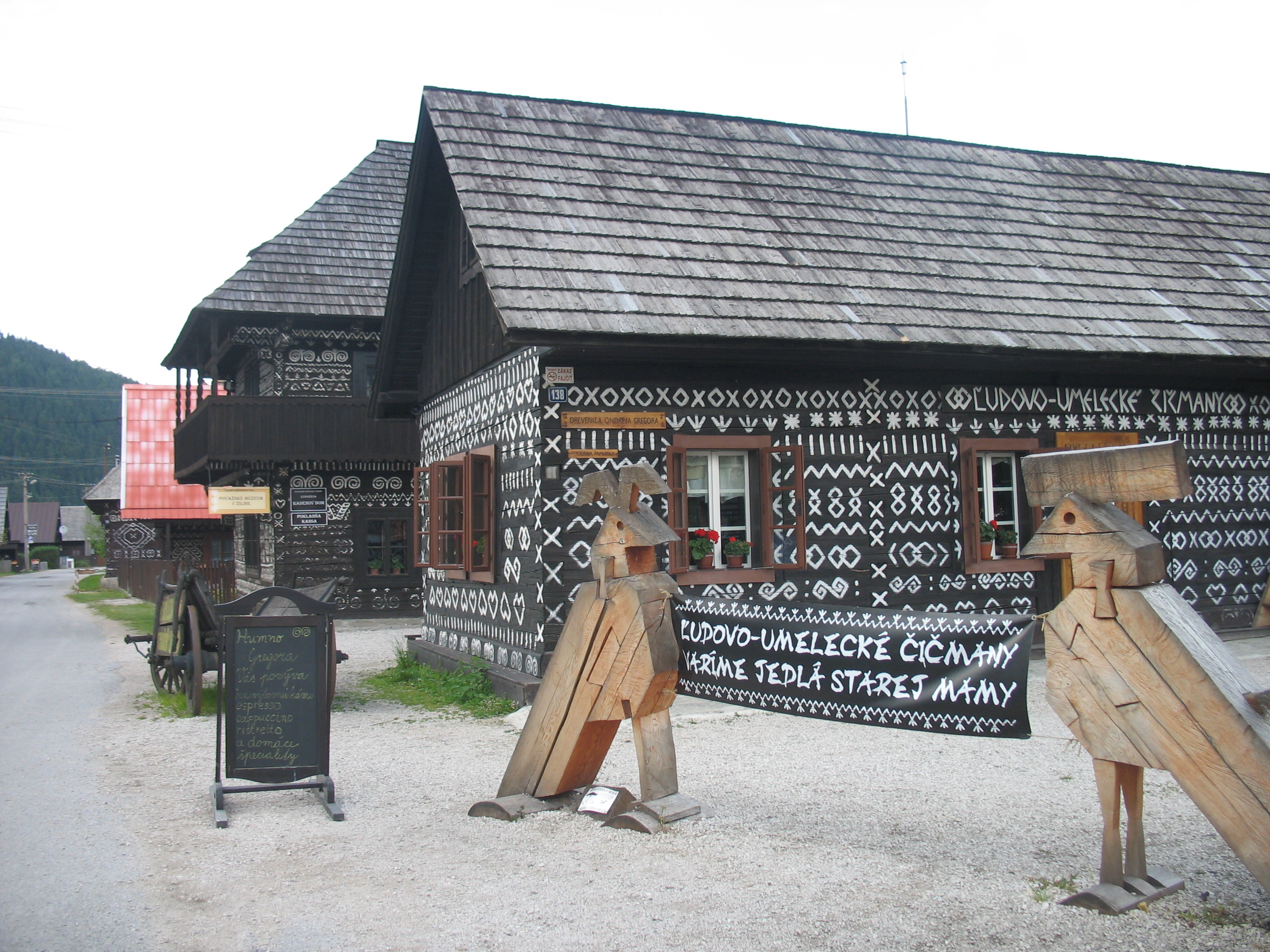
Folk architecture in Čičmany

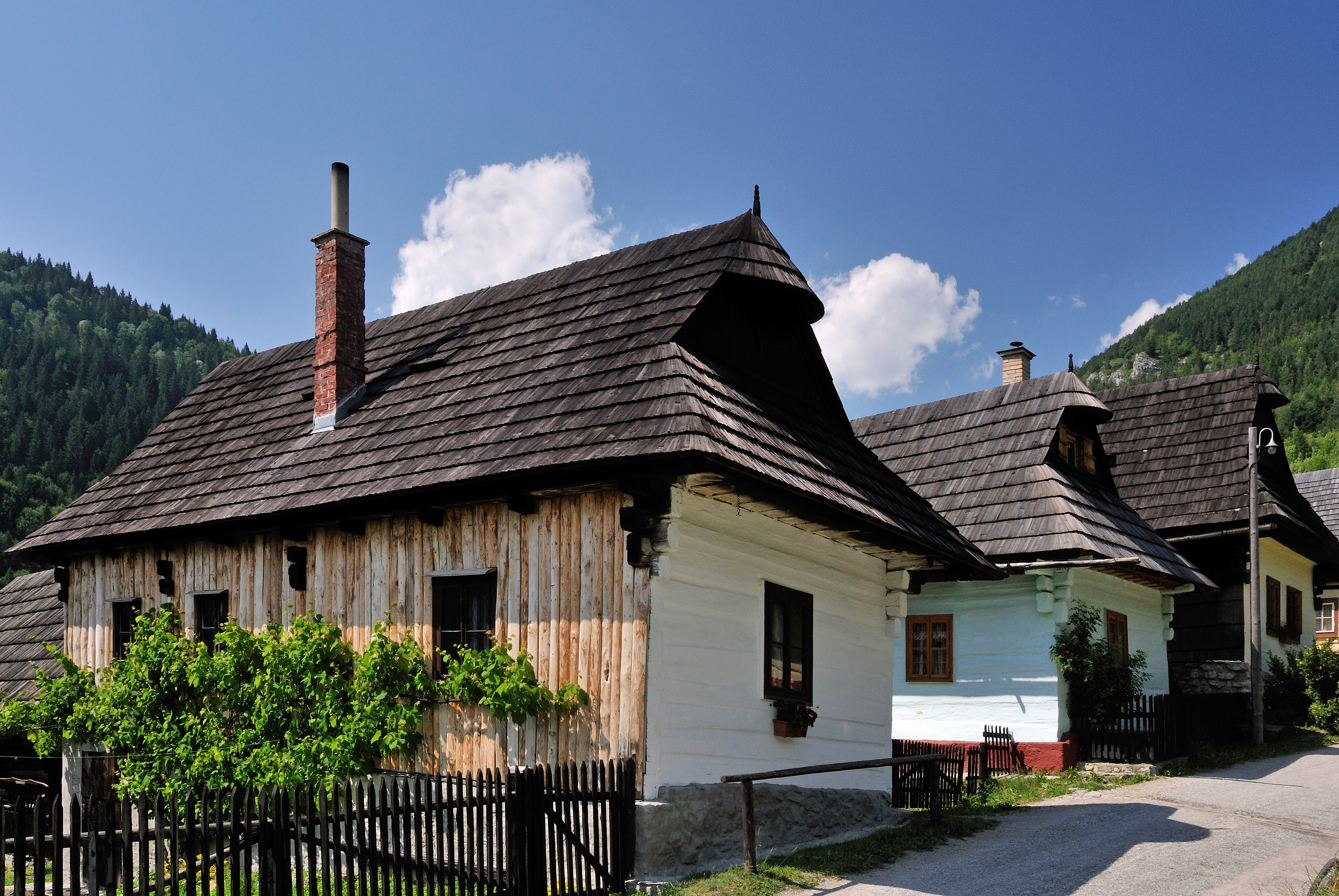
Wooden folk architecture can be seen in the well preserved village of Vlkolínec, a UNESCO World Heritage Site

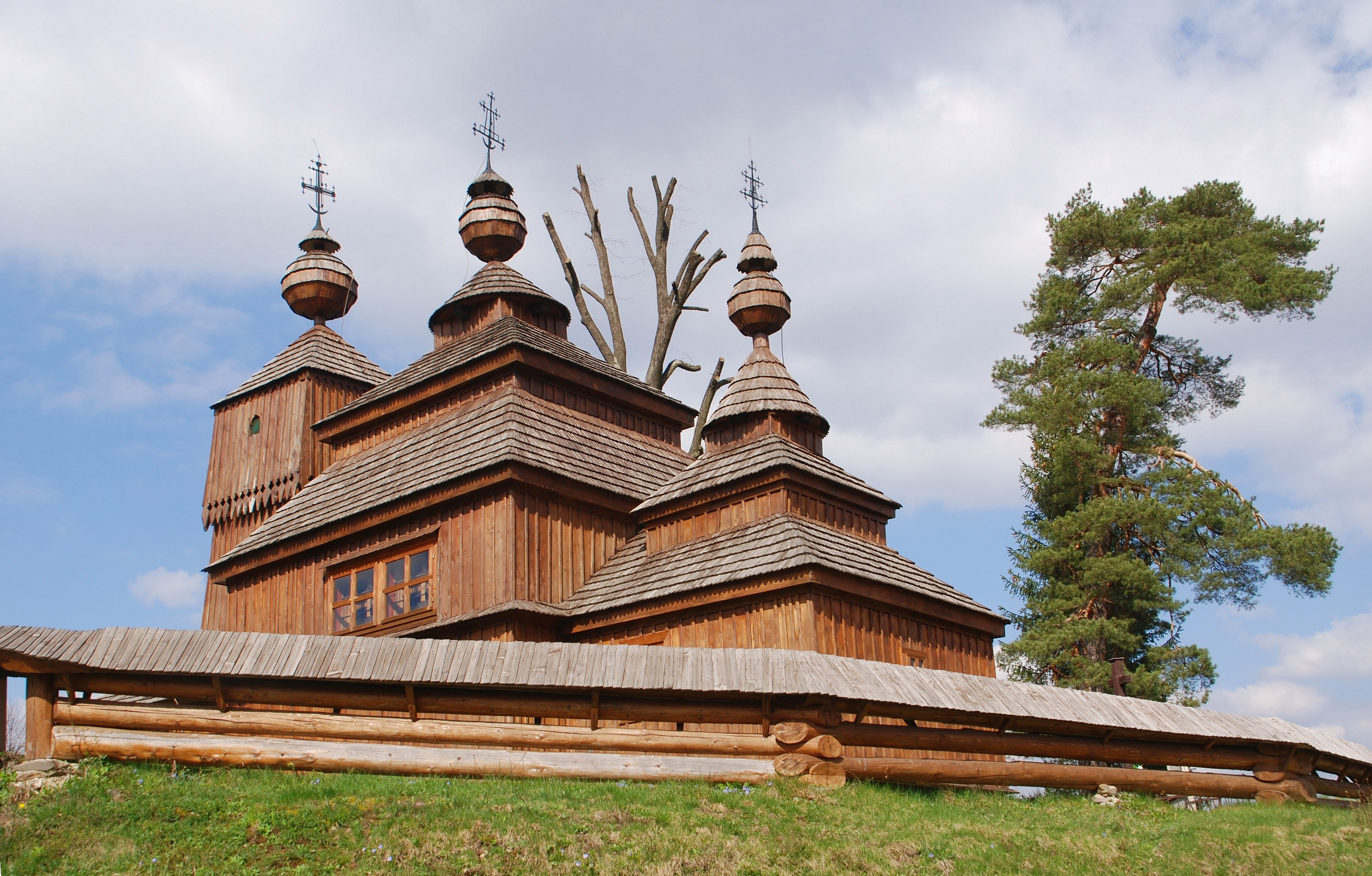
This wooden church in Bodružal is an example of Rusyn folk architecture and is a UNESCO World Heritage Site

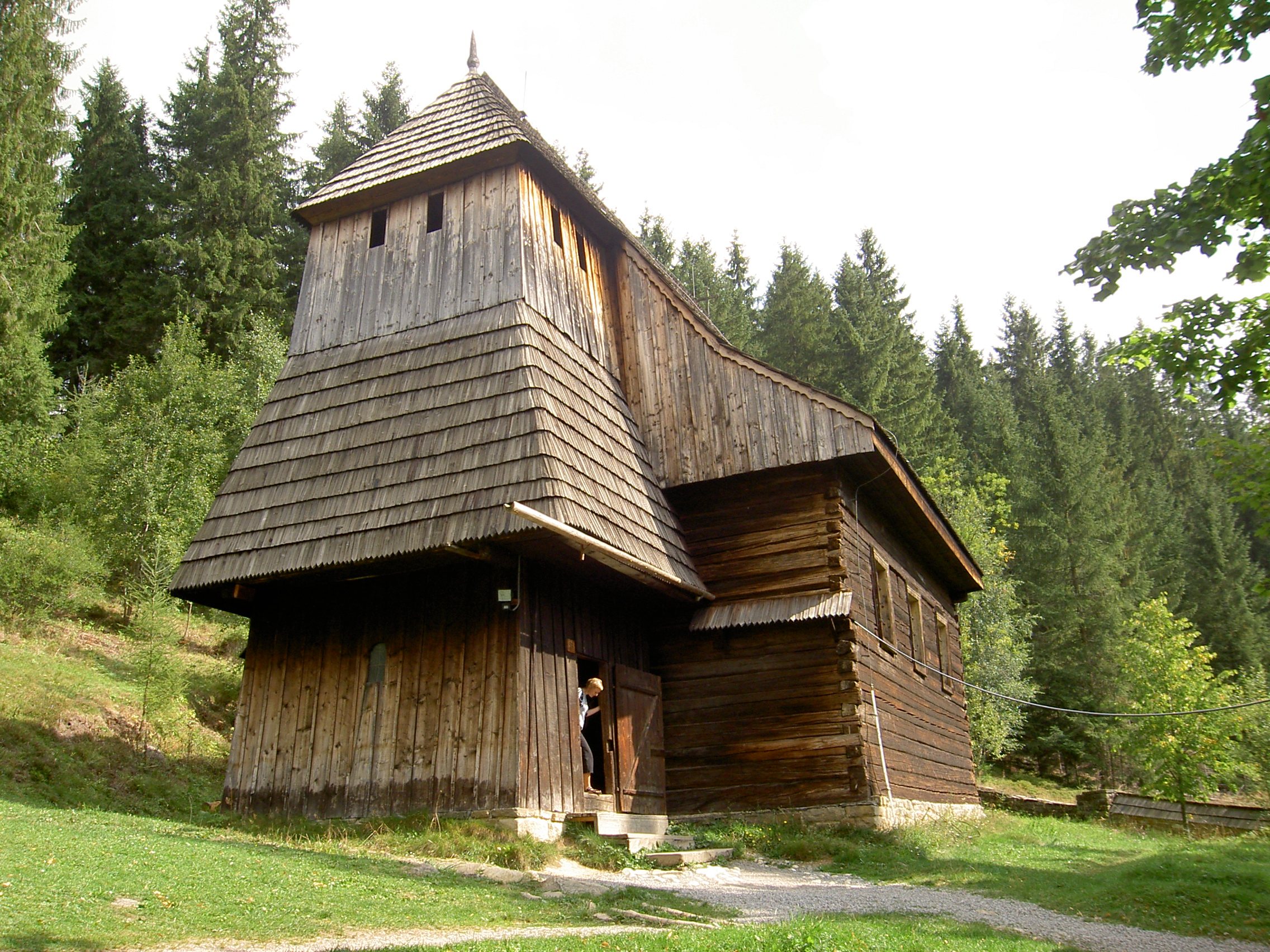
Wooden church at the Open Air Museum, Zuberec – Brestová

== Baroque and Rococo architecture ==
Wealthy aristocrats and merchants in present-day Slovakia from the 1600s used to appreciate Vienna-style baroque; the university church of St John the Baptist in Trnava is one of the early examples. Flowery rococo followed the influence of Maria Theresa, Queen of Hungary in the 18th century, with swags and plaster decorations in Old Town Bratislava. Examples include Grassalkovich Palace, built in 1760 (today's residence of the President of Slovakia), as well as the Episcopal Summer Palace (reconstructed in 1761–1765) and the Mirbach Palace, from 1768 to 1770.

Baroque

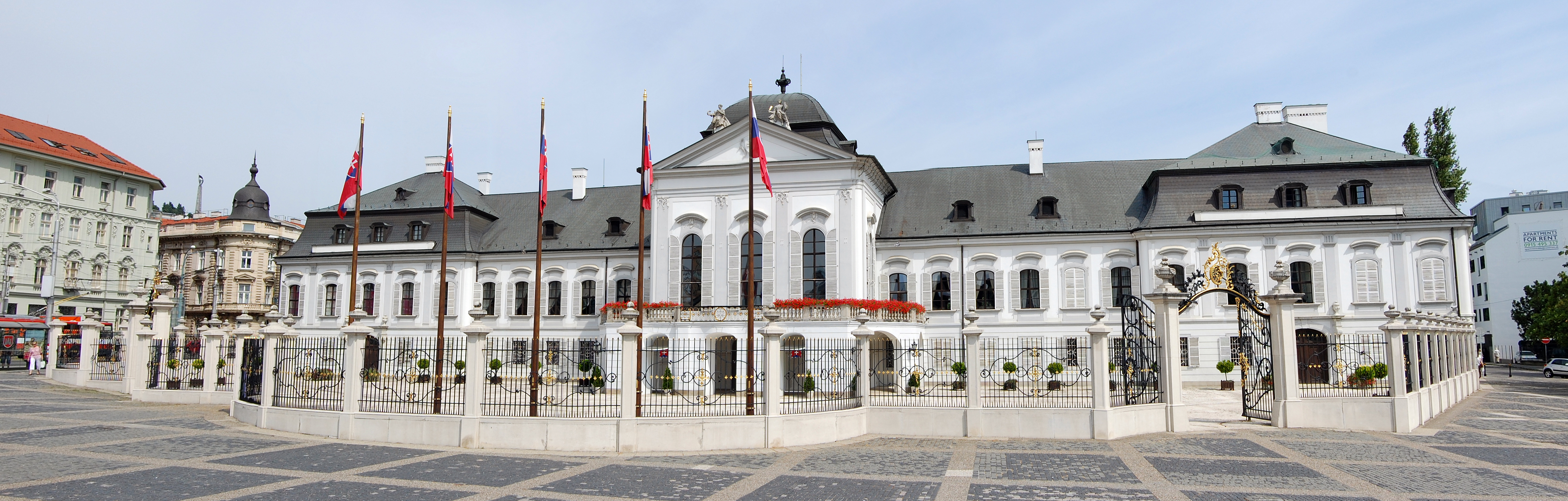
Grassalkovich Palace

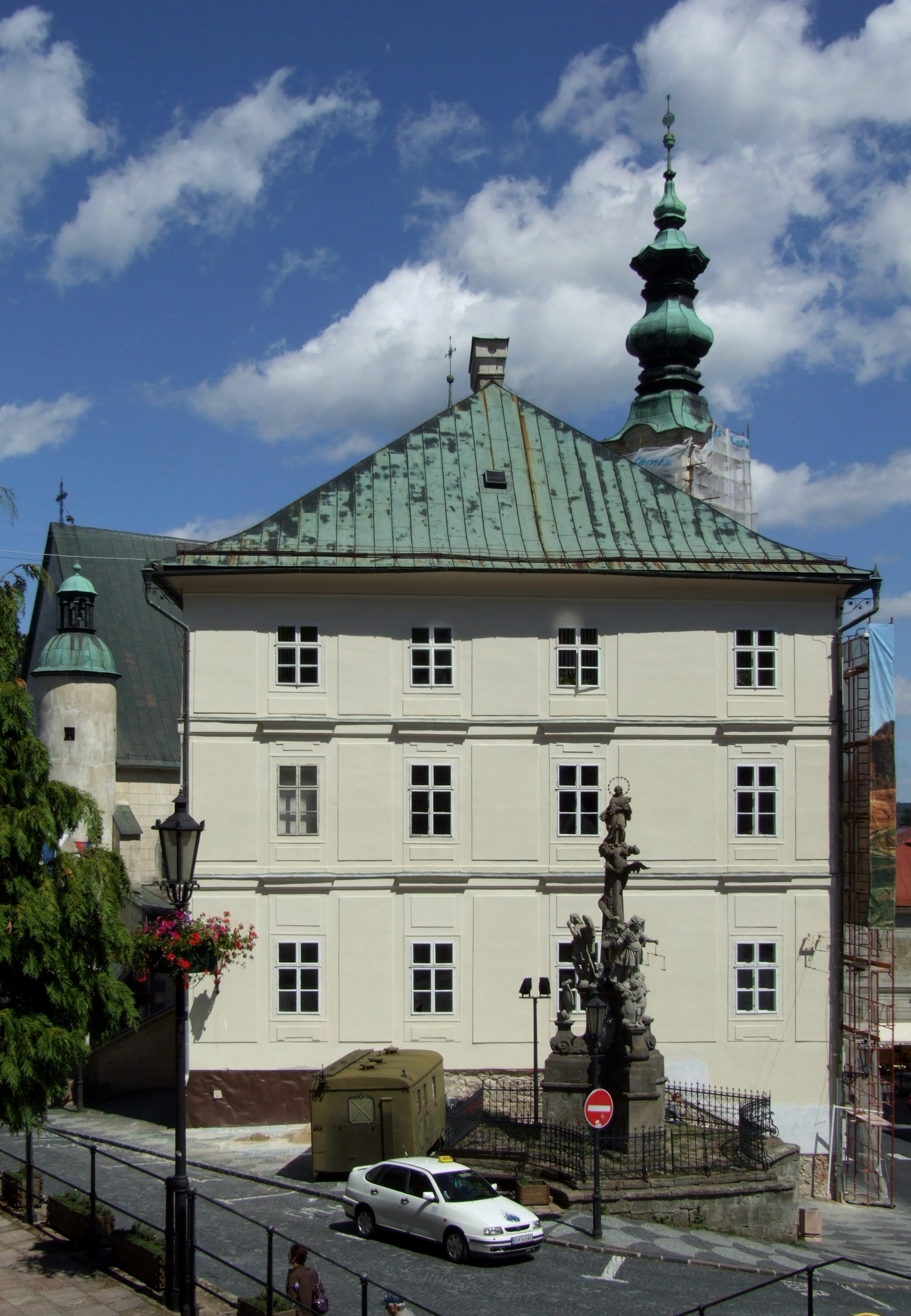
Town hall in Banská Štiavnica

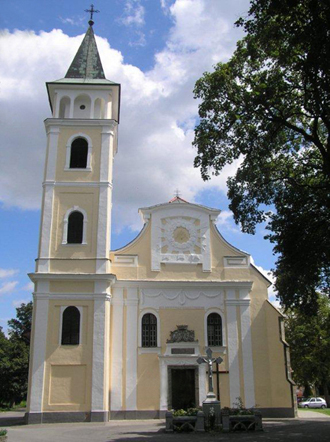
Church of the Nativity of the Blessed Virgin Mary, Michalovce

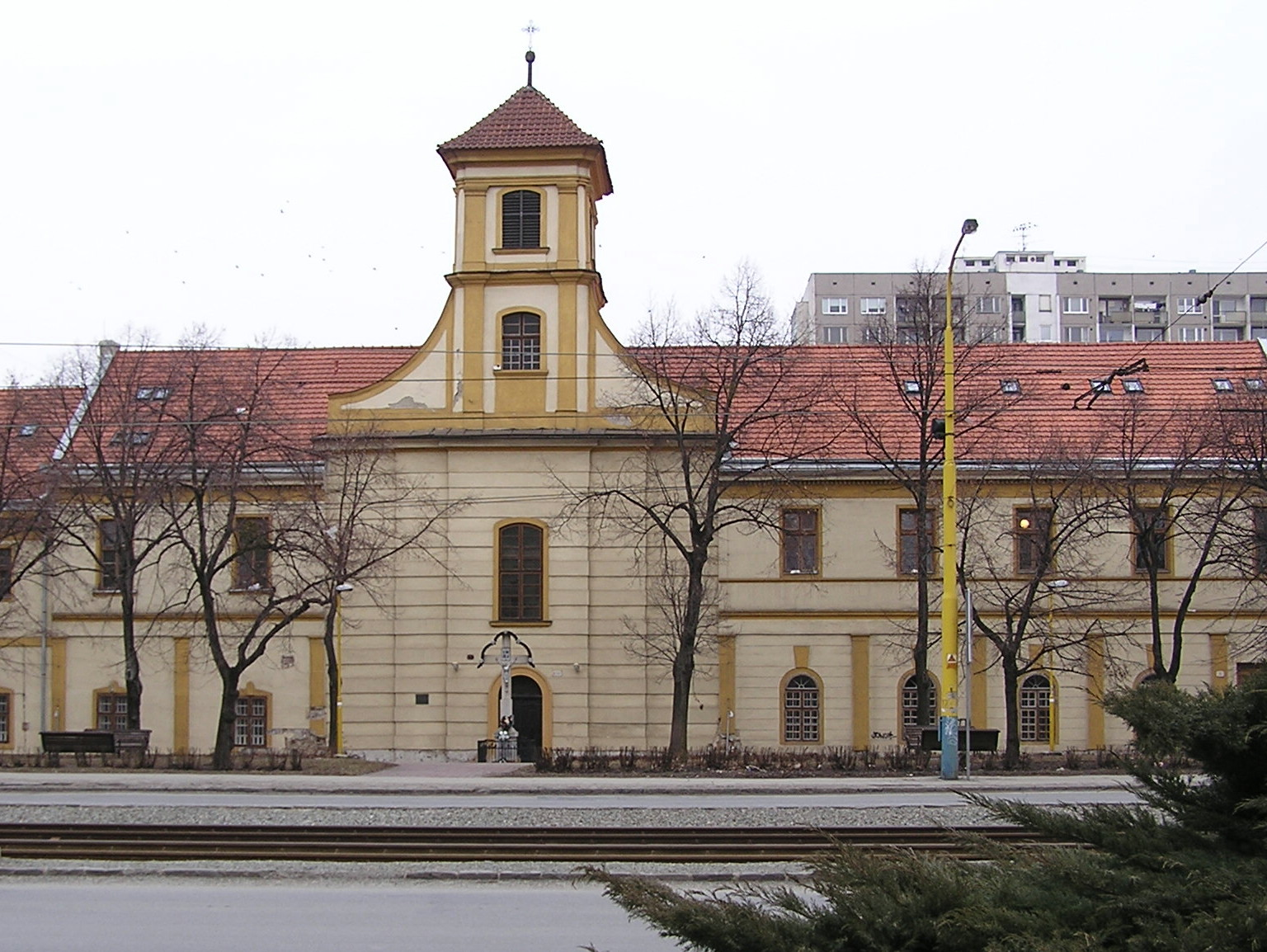
Holy Spirit Church (Košice)

Rococo

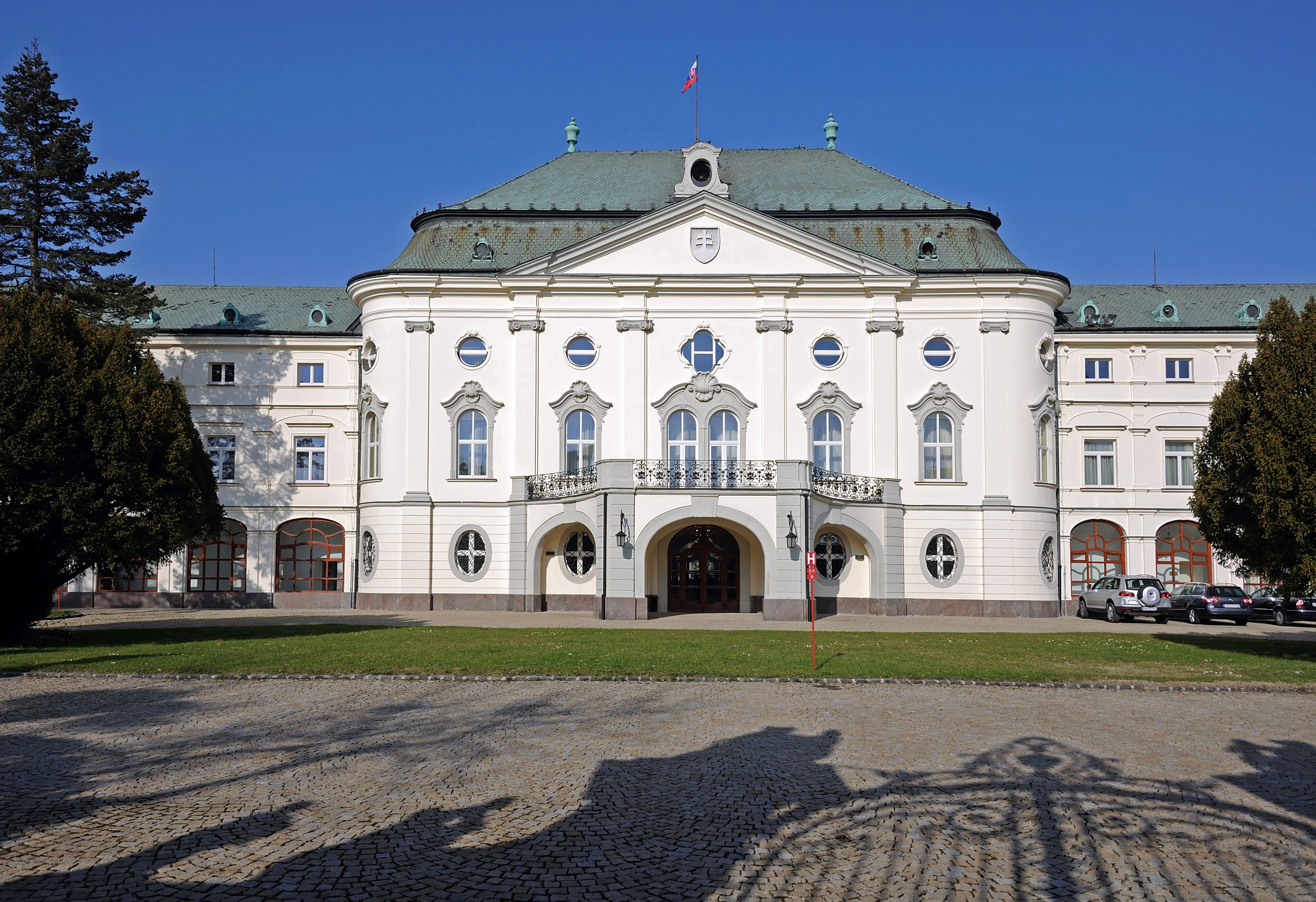
Episcopal Summer Palace, Bratislava

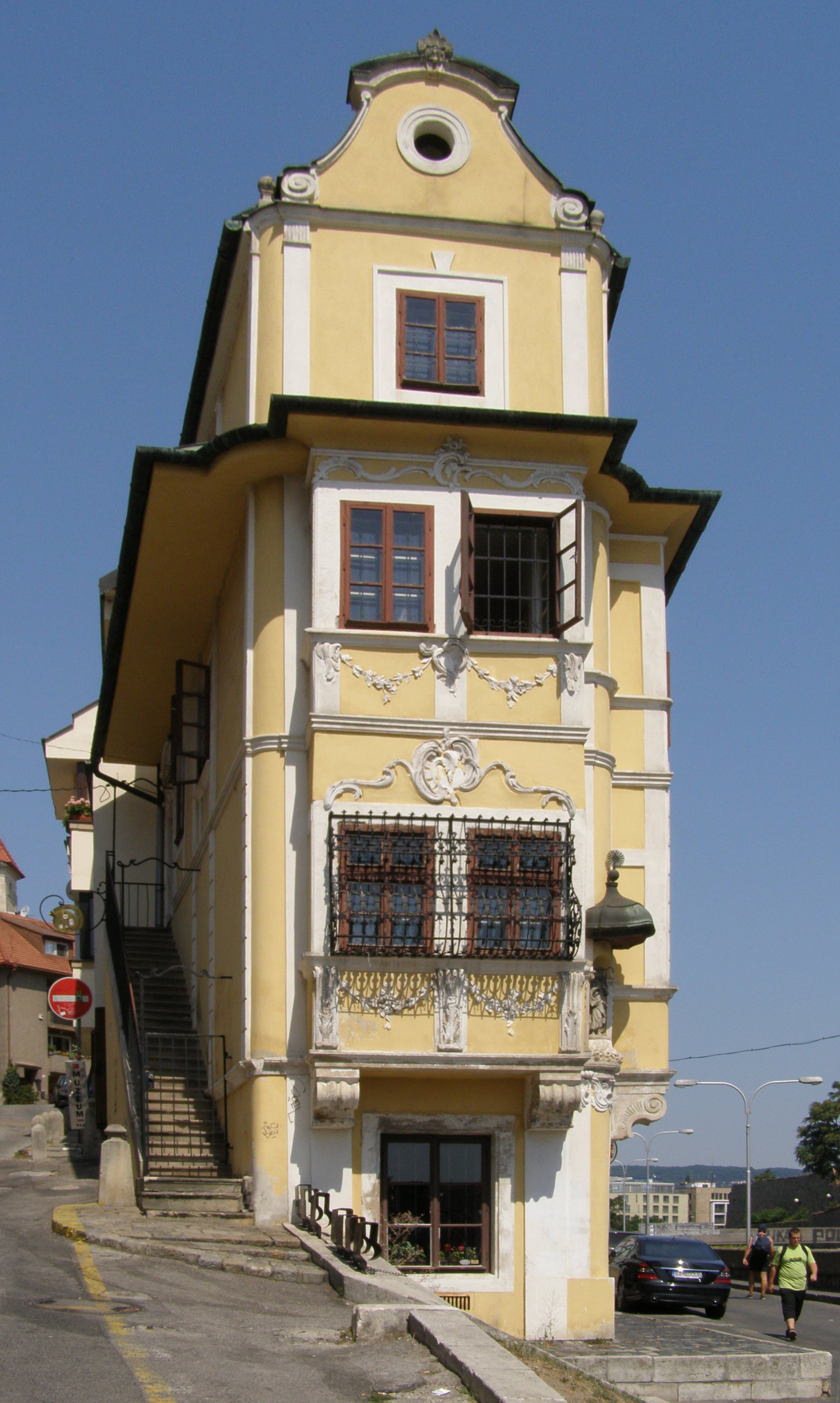
House of the Good Shepherd, Bratislava, 1760–65

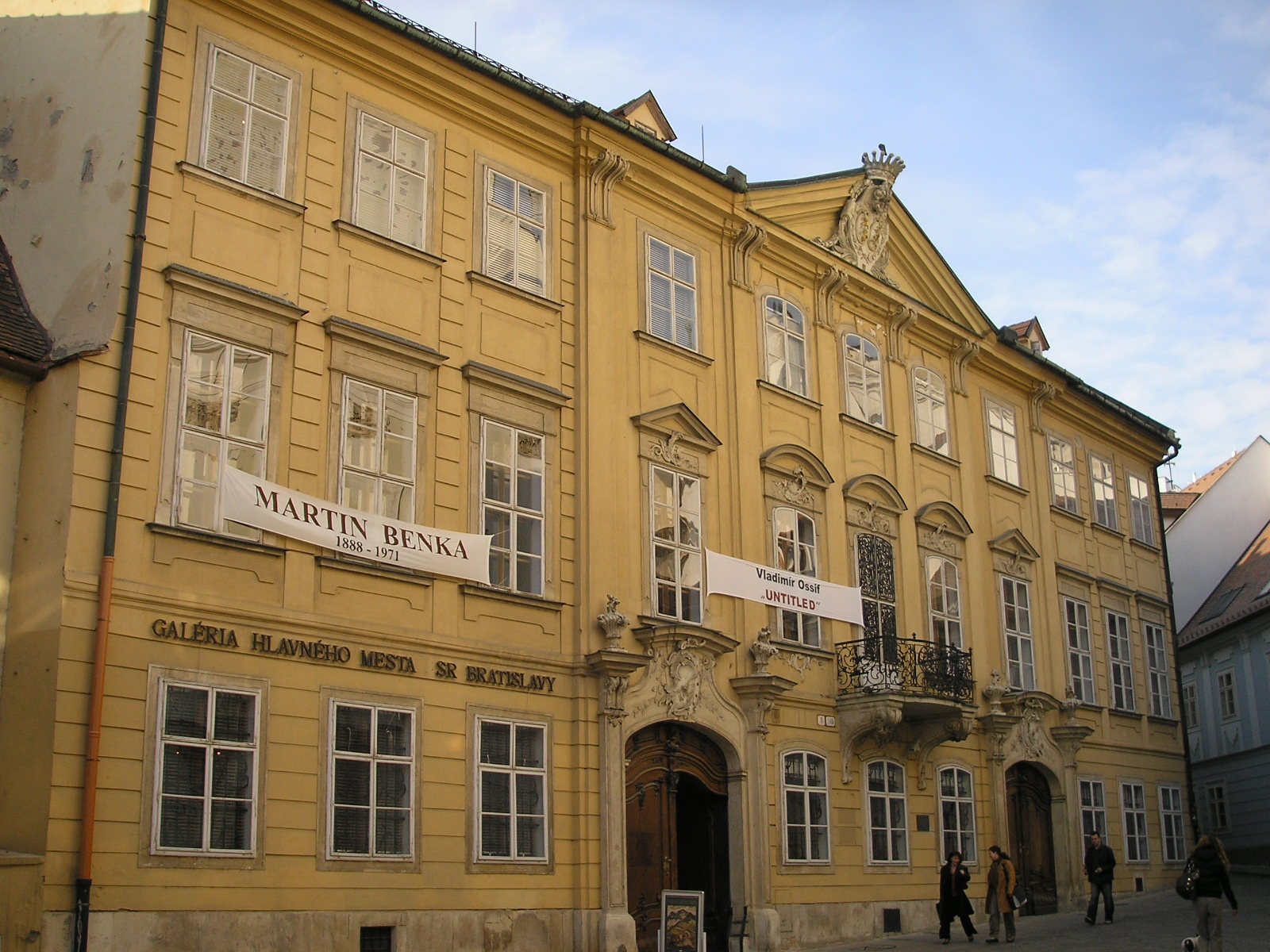
Mirbach Palace, Bratislava, 1768–70

=== Historicist styles ===
Several palaces and churches were built in historicist styles in the 18th and 19th centuries. Examples of neoclassical architecture include Bratislava's Primate's Palace, by Melchior Hefele, 1778–81, and the Evangelical Church of Košice by Georg Kitzling, 1816. The East Slovak Museum in Košice, 1872, is an illustration of Neo-Renaissance architecture. Gothic Revival was used as a style for castles, such as Orava Castle and Bojnice Castle, as well as for the Church of Holy Trinity, Mošovce, rebuilt 1912–13.

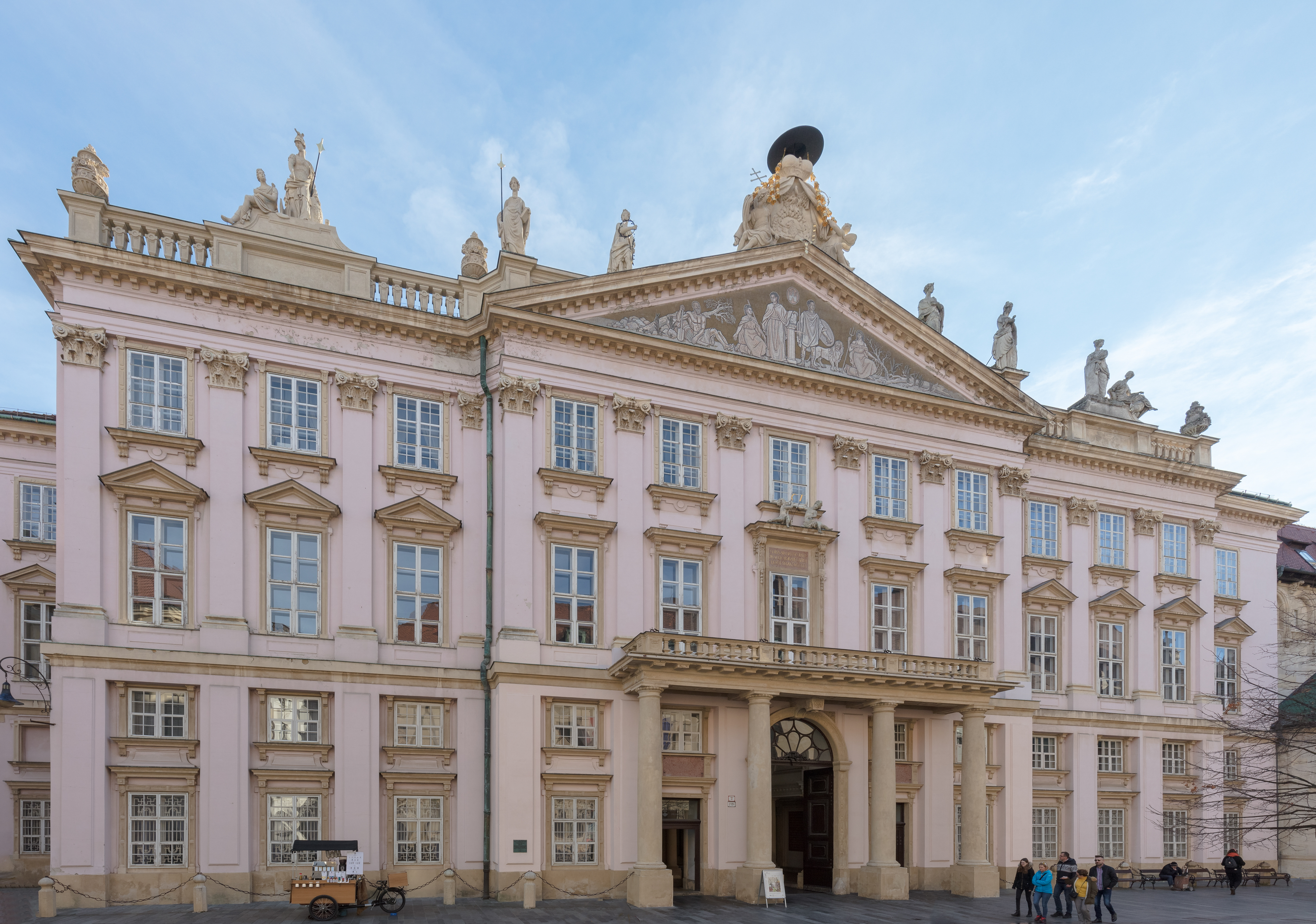
Neoclassical Primate's Palace, Bratislava, by Melchior Hefele, 1778–81

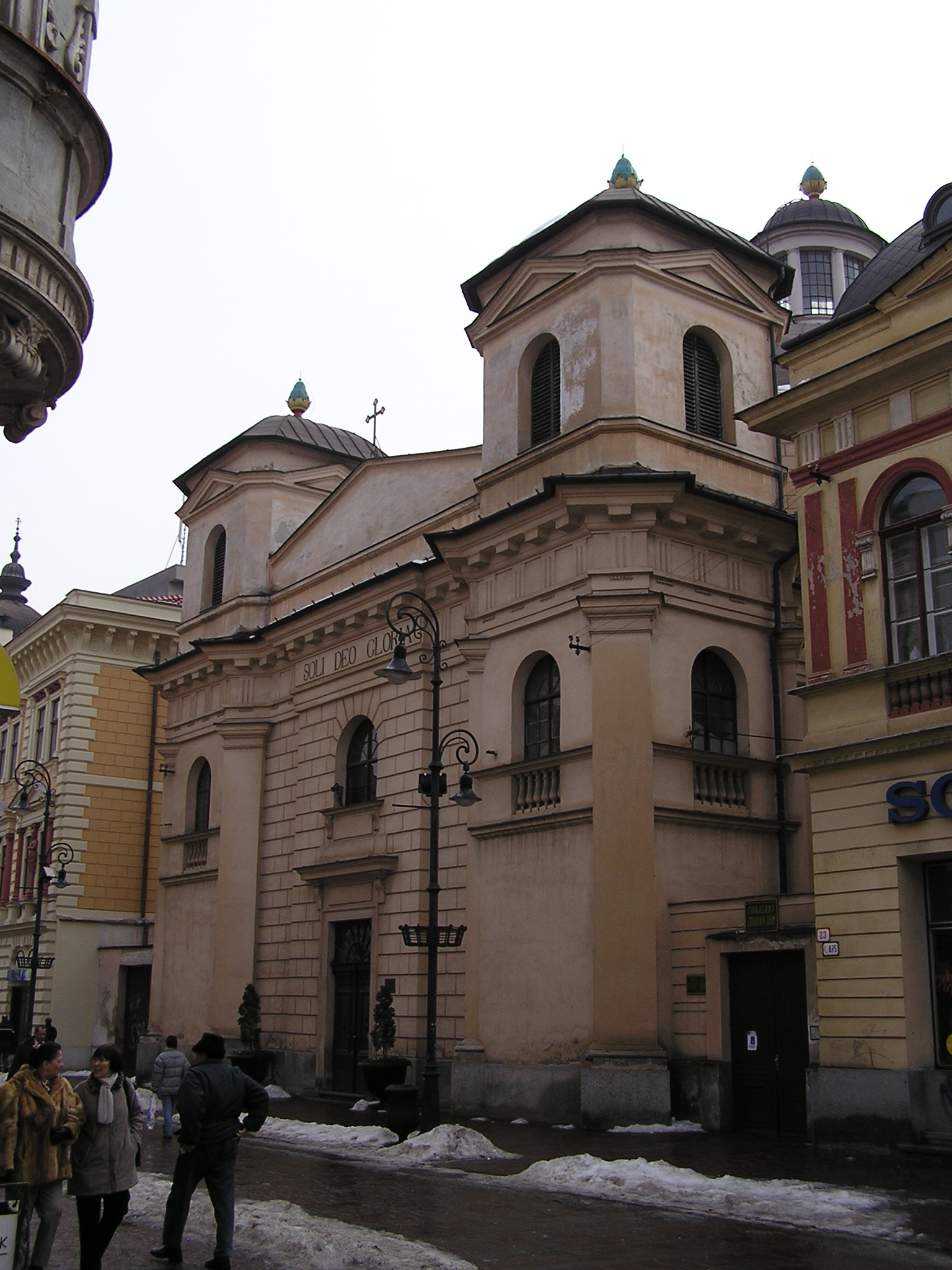
Neoclassical Evangelical Church of Košice by Georg Kitzling, 1816

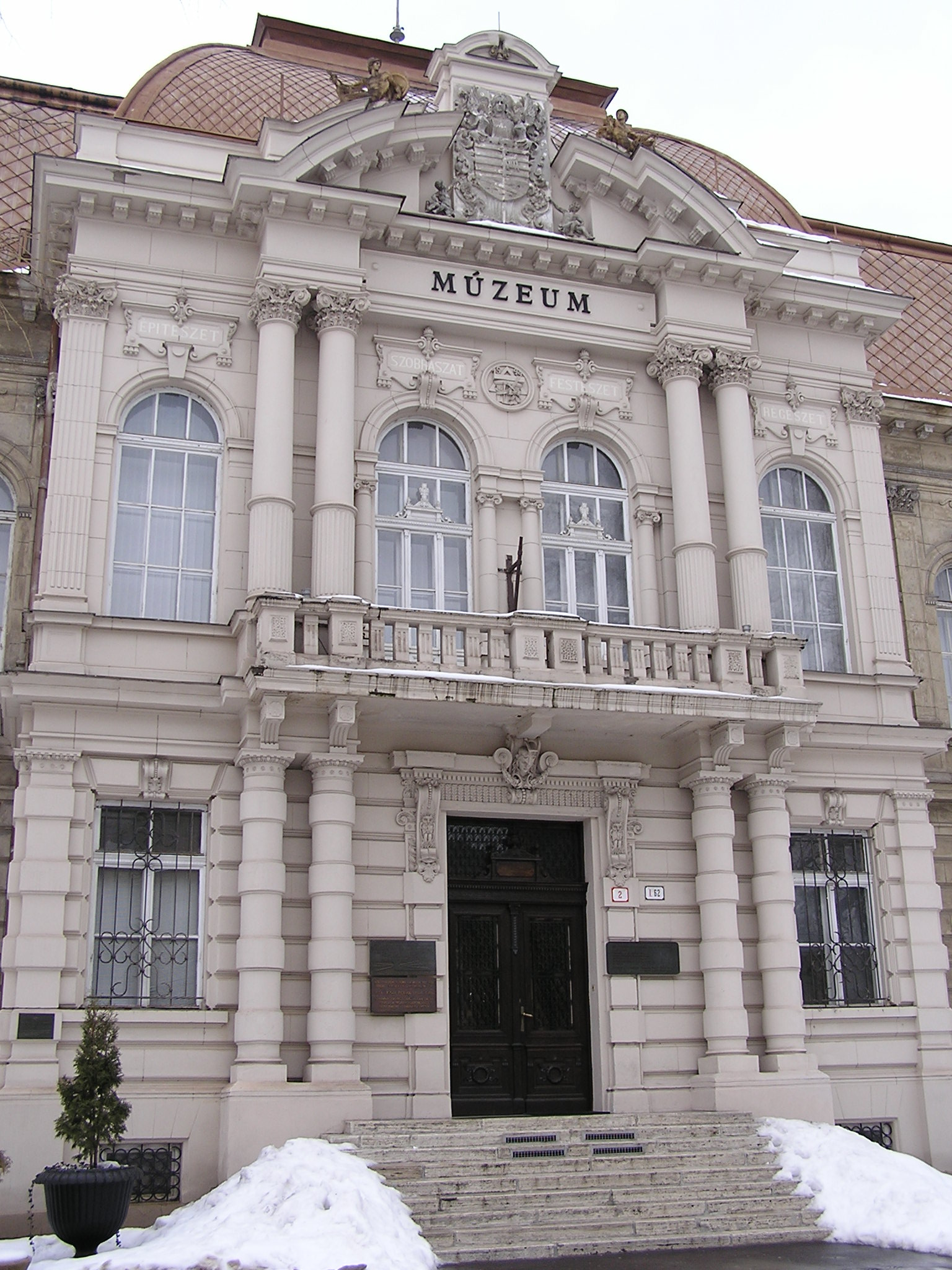
Neo-Renaissance East Slovak Museum in Košice, 1872

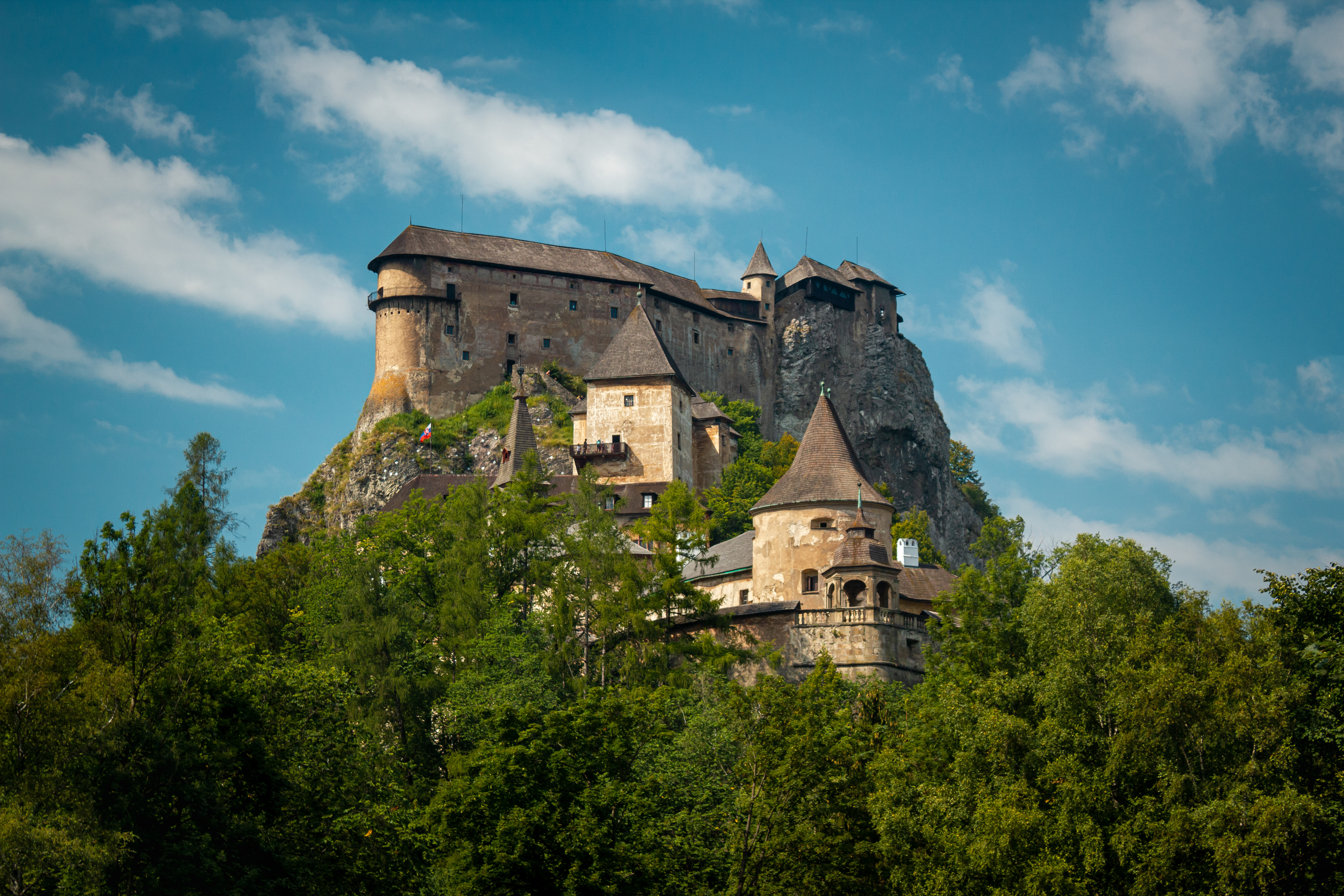
Neo-gothic Orava Castle

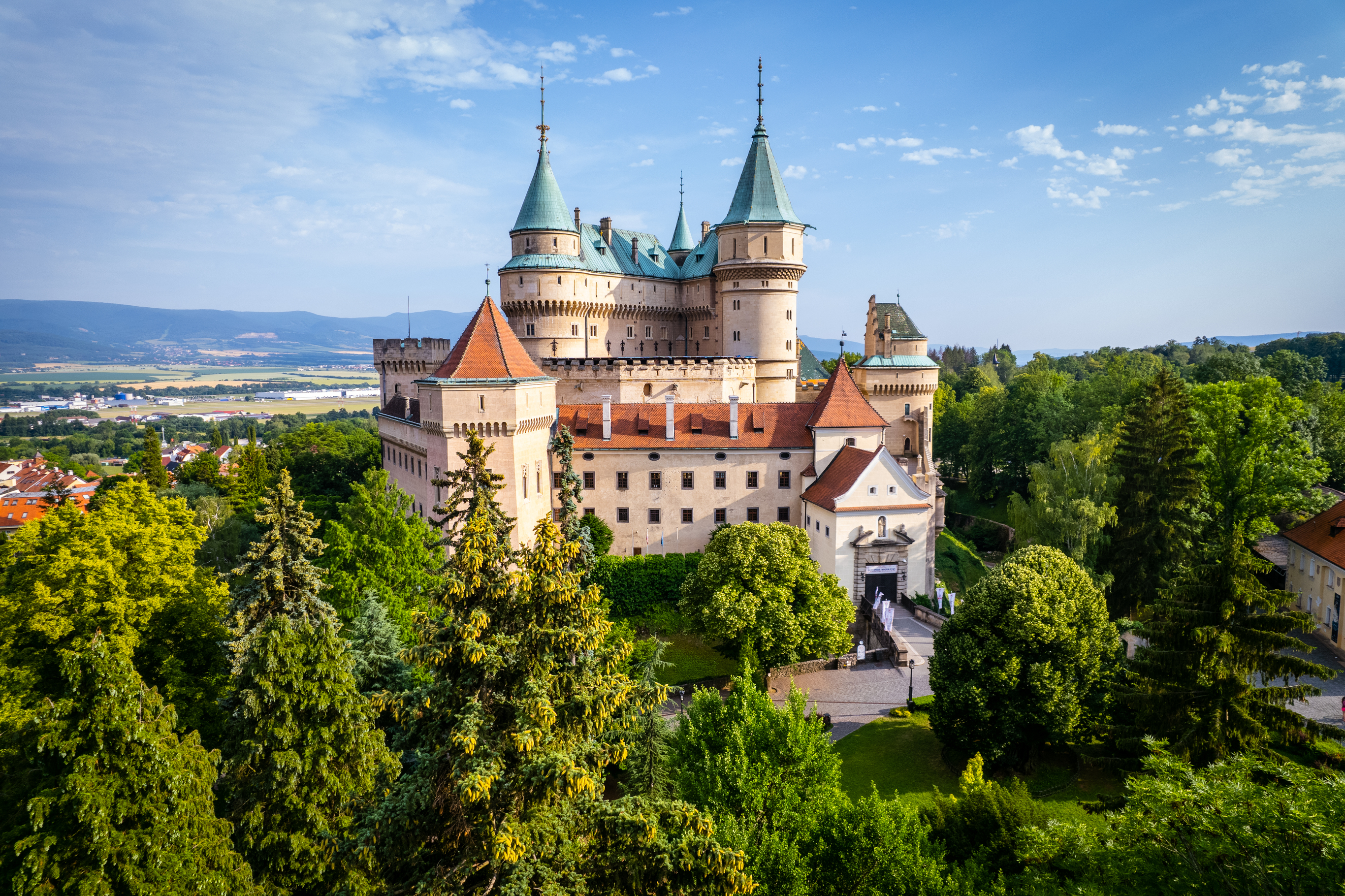
Neo-gothic Bojnice Castle

== Art Nouveau and Secession style ==
Art Nouveau architecture took hold in present-day Slovakia by the turn of the 20th century. The fancy Blue Church design by Ödön Lechner in 1905 in Hungarian Art Nouveau is a feat. Lechner also designed the Gamča gymnasium in Bratislava, built in 1906–08, while Dušan Jurkovič built the Skalica Culture House. In Košice, the Hotel Slávia features as Art Nouveau mosaic façade.

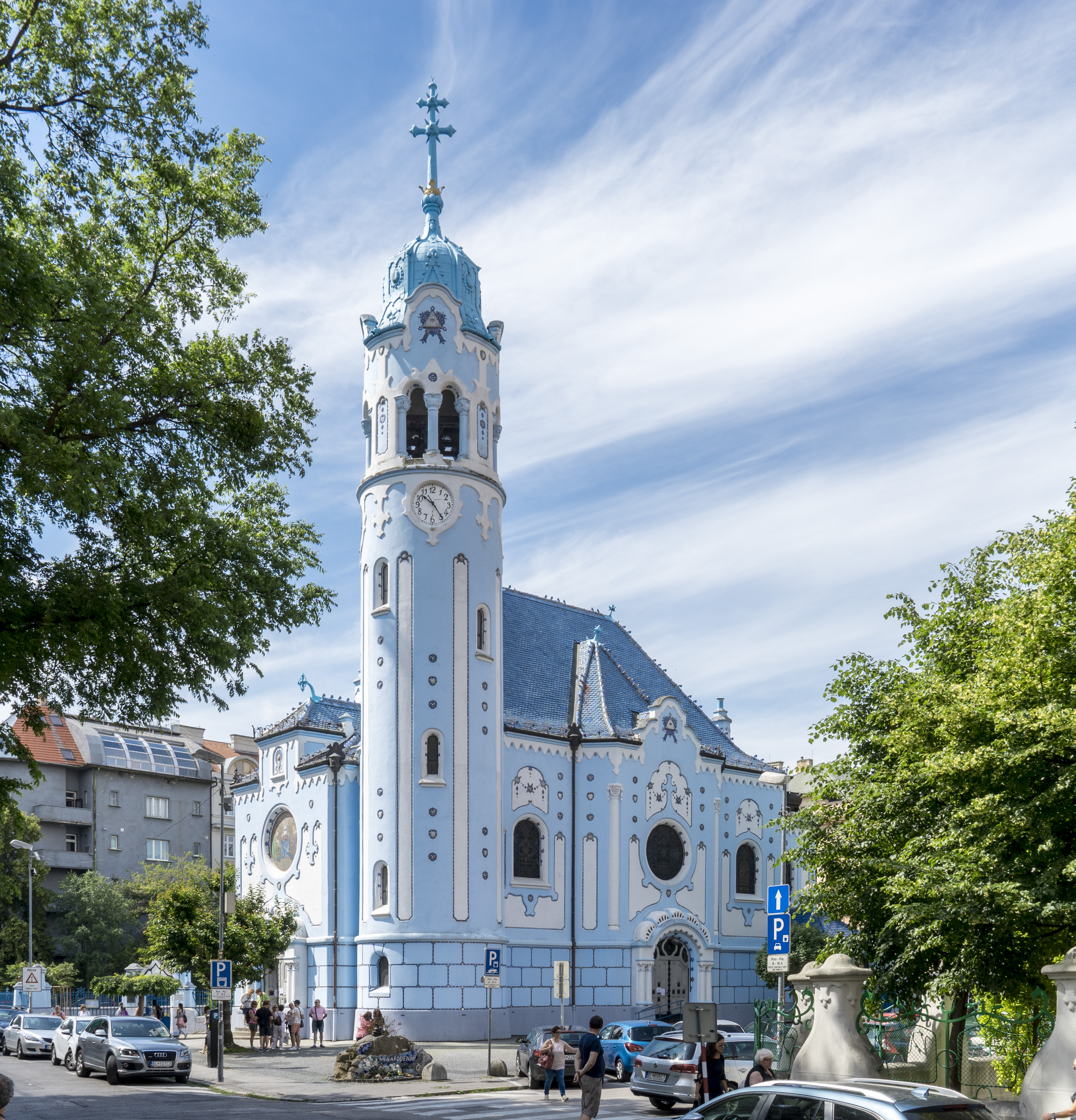
Blue Church in Bratislava, design by Ödön Lechner, 1905, in Hungarian Art Nouveau style

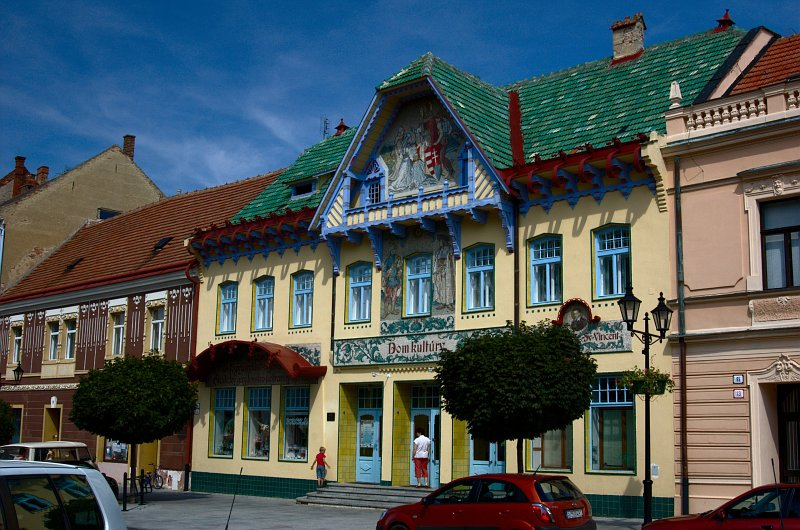
Skalica Culture House by Dušan Jurkovič, 1905

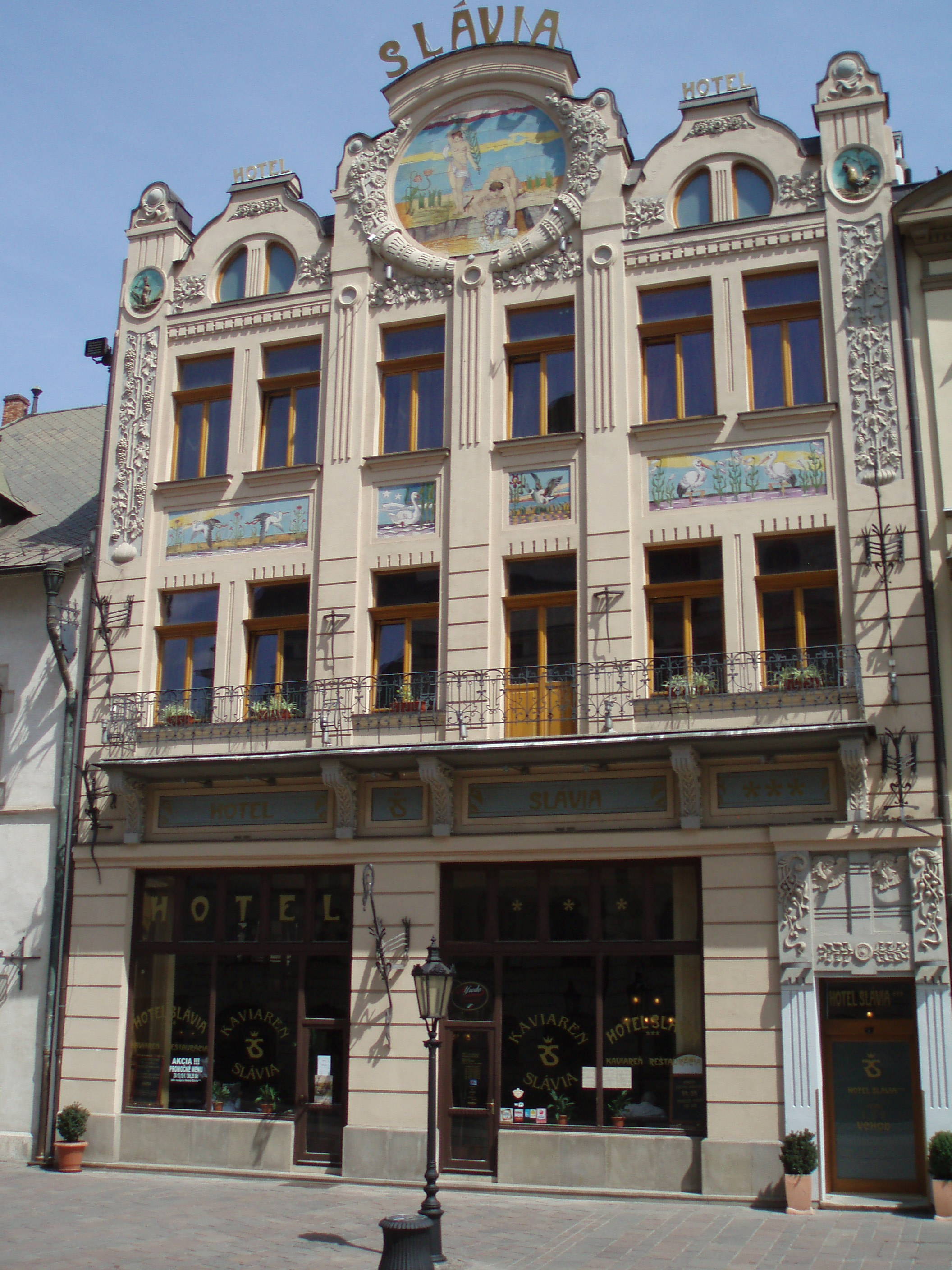
Hotel Slávia, Košice

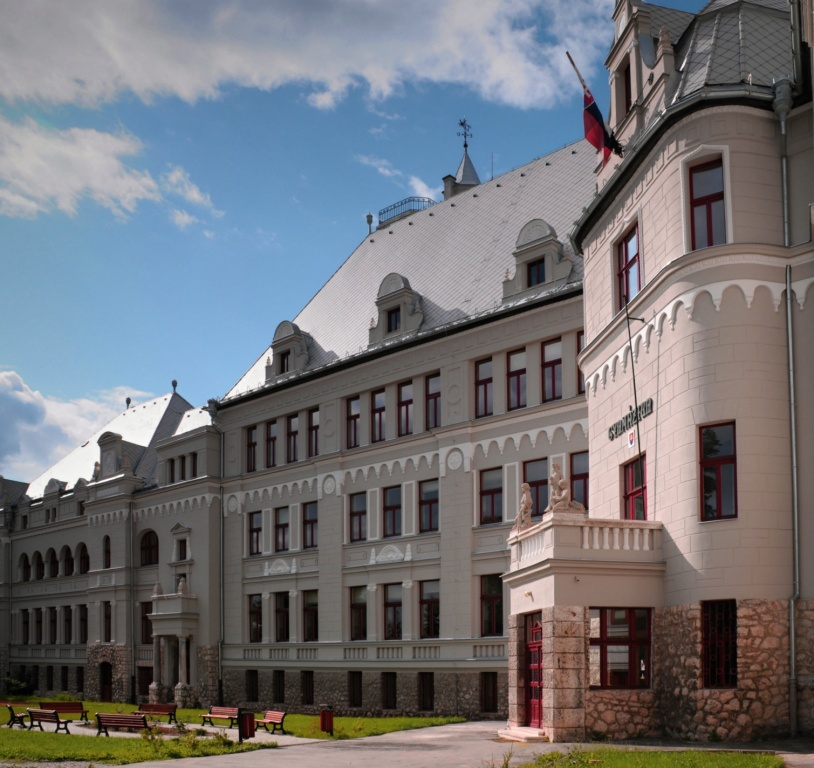
Ján Francisci-Rimavský Gymnasium in Levoča by Alfréd Hajós, 1913

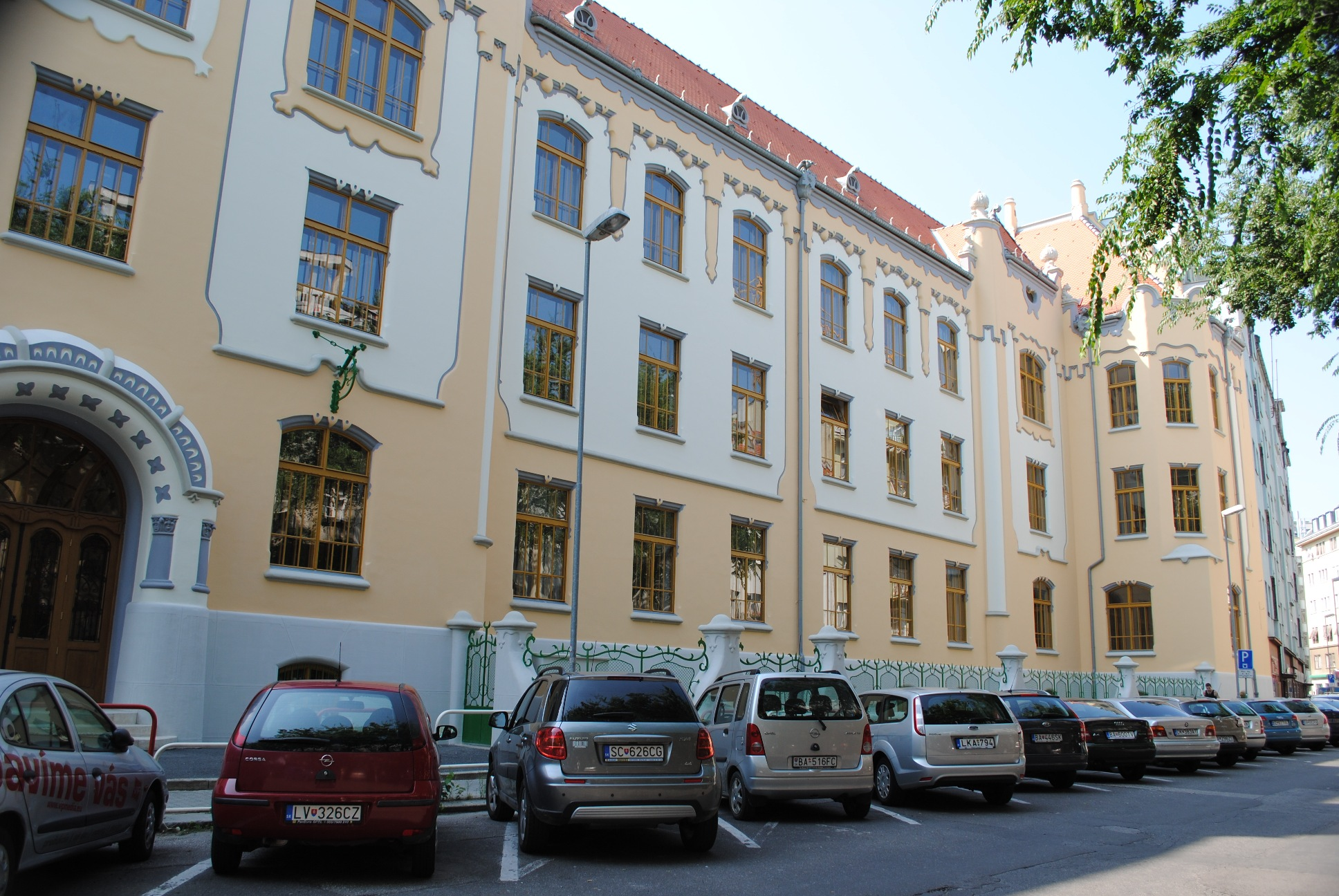
Gamča gymnasium in Bratislava, design by Ödön Lechner, built 1906–08

== Modernist architecture ==
In the interwar period, Bratislava was a site for several modernist architectural styles:

- Czech Cubism is evident in Bratislava's Heydukova Street Synagogue, by Artur Szalatnai, 1923–26. The synagogue is an important example of Slovak religious architecture of the 20th century and it is listed as a Slovak National Cultural Monument. The exterior has a towerless, seven-pillared colonnade. The interior includes a large sanctuary in which modern steel-and-concrete construction and contemporary Cubist details are combined with historicist elements.
- The austere tomb of Slovak politician and diplomat Milan Rastislav Štefánik was built in 1924–1928 in Brezová pod Bradlom upon design by Dušan Jurkovič.
- Žilina's Nová Synagóga was built in 1928–1931 to designs of German modernist architect Peter Behrens. Deemed "the last Slovak synagogue", it was restored 2011–17 to become an arts centre.
- The Kolonádový most (Colonnade Bridge) in Piešťany was designed by architect Emil Belluš in 1930–33, in the Streamline Moderne style of Art Deco, and features glass engravings by Martin Benka. The "Crutch Breaker" statue by Robert Kuhmayer (1934) stands at the western entrance. The bridge was destroyed in 1945 and reconstructed in 1956.
- Bratislava's Housing complex Unitas are open gallery–type apartment complex designed by architects Fridrich Weinwurm and Ignác Vécsei, with austere architectural forms. At the time of its building in 1931, this complex was a rare example of functionalist principles applied to a housing project in Slovakia.
- The Nová doba Estate was built in 1932 in Bratislava according to the plans of architects Fridrich Weinwurm (1885–1942) and Ignác Vécsei (1883–1944) connected with the socialist concept of the minimum dwelling (Karel Teige, 1932) and is also close to the ideas of functionalism. The complex is an excellent example of the new urban, technical and economic approach to solve social housing problems.

Socialist modernism also left a couple of hallmarks in Bratislava, including the Slovak Radio Building and the Most SNP:

- The Most SNP ("Bridge of the Slovak National Uprising") is the world's longest bridge to have one pylon and one cable-stayed plane. The bridge was built between 1967 and 1972 upon design by A. Tesár, J. Lacko, and I. Slameň. A significant section of the Old Town below Bratislava Castle, which included nearly all of the Jewish quarter, was demolished to create the roadway to the bridge.
- The Slovak Radio Building, shaped like an upside down pyramid, was designed in 1967 by Štefan Svetko, Štefan Ďurkovič and Barnabáš Kissling and completed in 1983, at a time when socialist realism was the official architectural style in Czechoslovakia. It was one of the first major buildings in Slovakia utilizing a steel frame and became one of Bratislava's architectural landmarks.
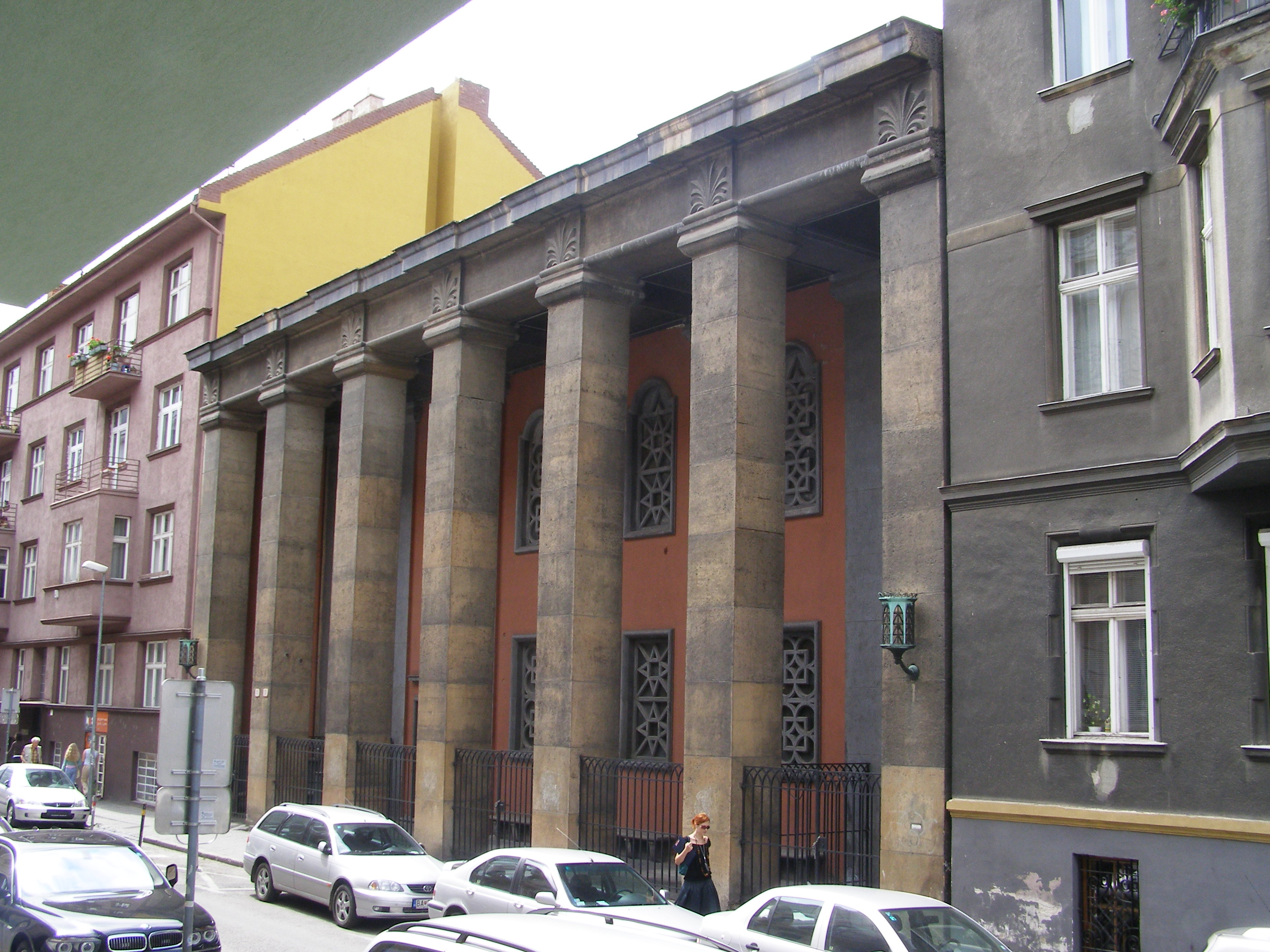
Cubist Heydukova Street Synagogue in Bratislava, by Artur Szalatnai, 1923–26

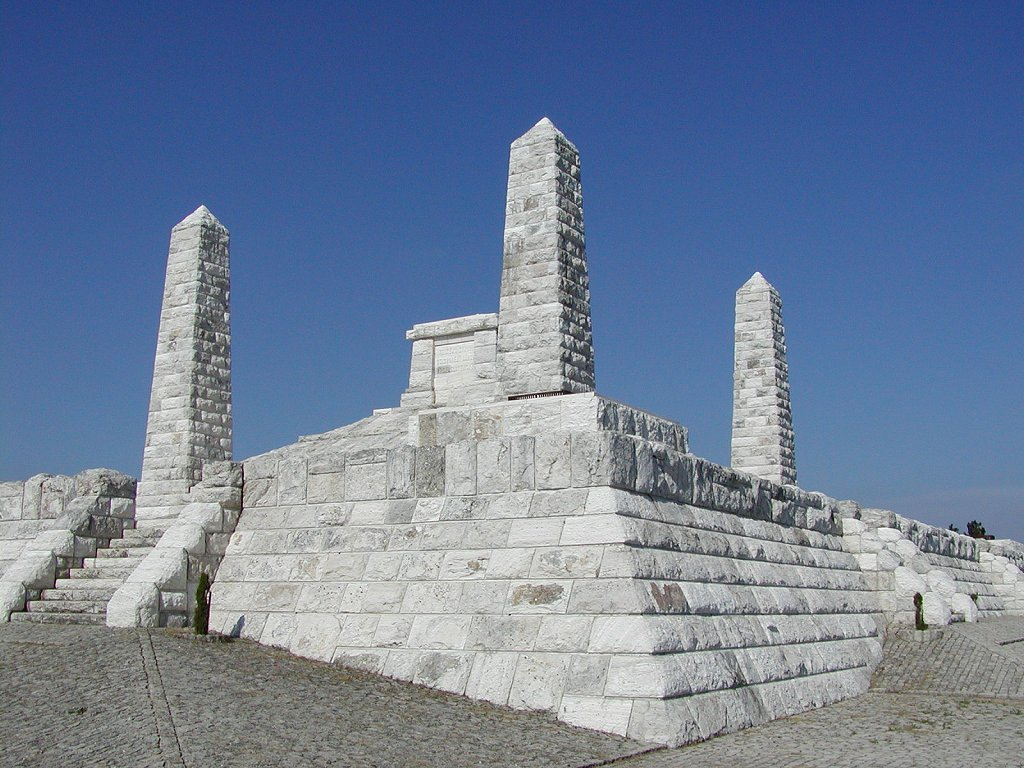
Tomb of general Milan R. Štefánik created by Dušan Jurkovič, 1924–28

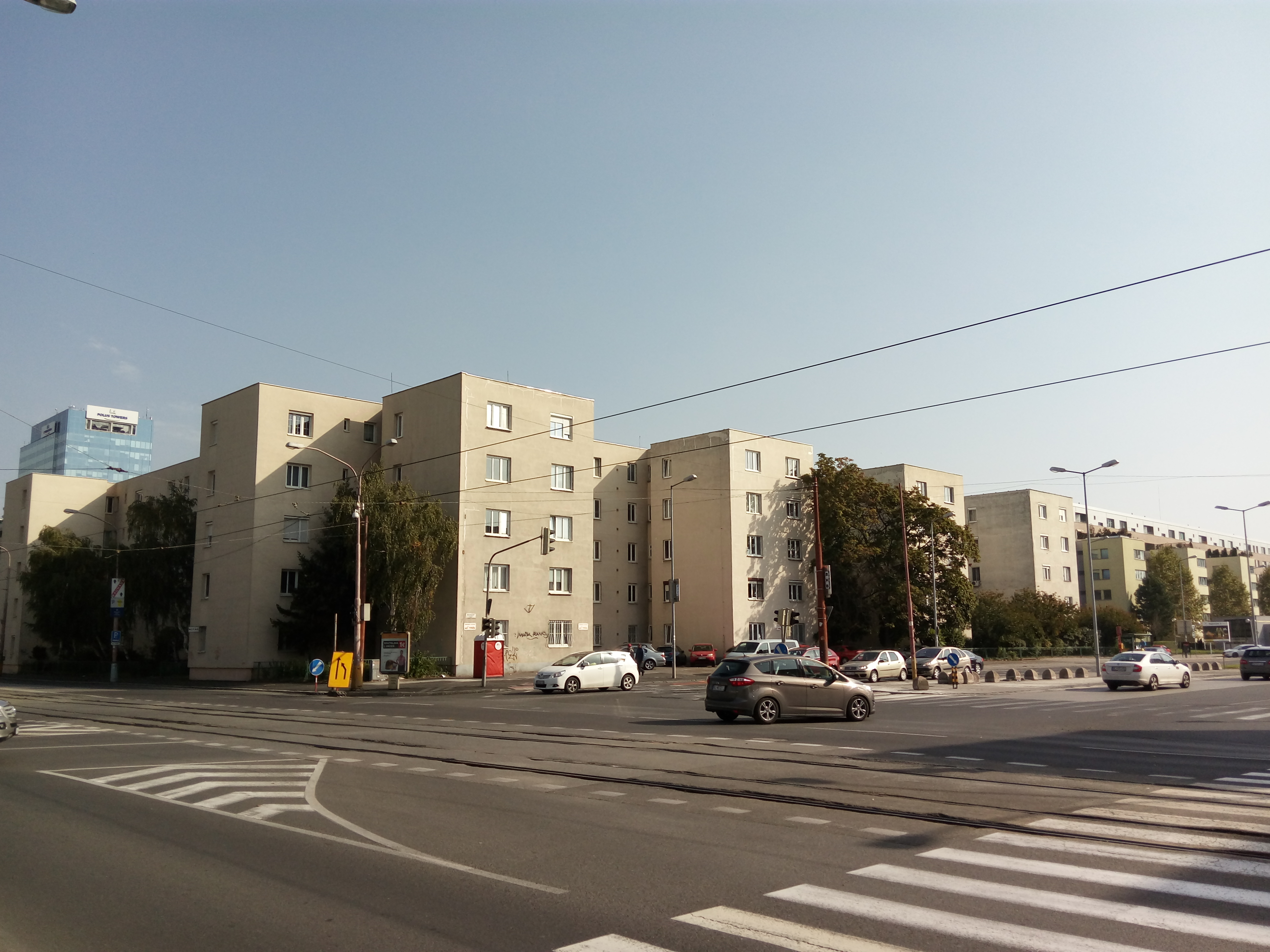
Nová doba Estate, Bratislava by Fridrich Weinwurm and Ignác Vécsei, 1932

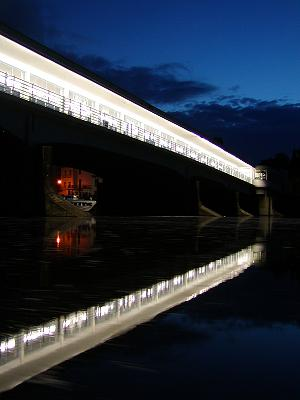
Functionalist Kolonádový most (Piešťany) by Emil Belluš, 1930–33

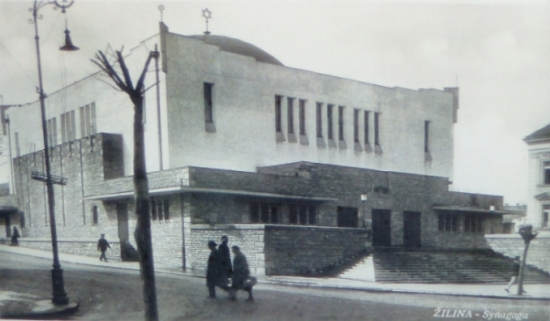
New Synagogue (Žilina) by Peter Behrens, 1928–31

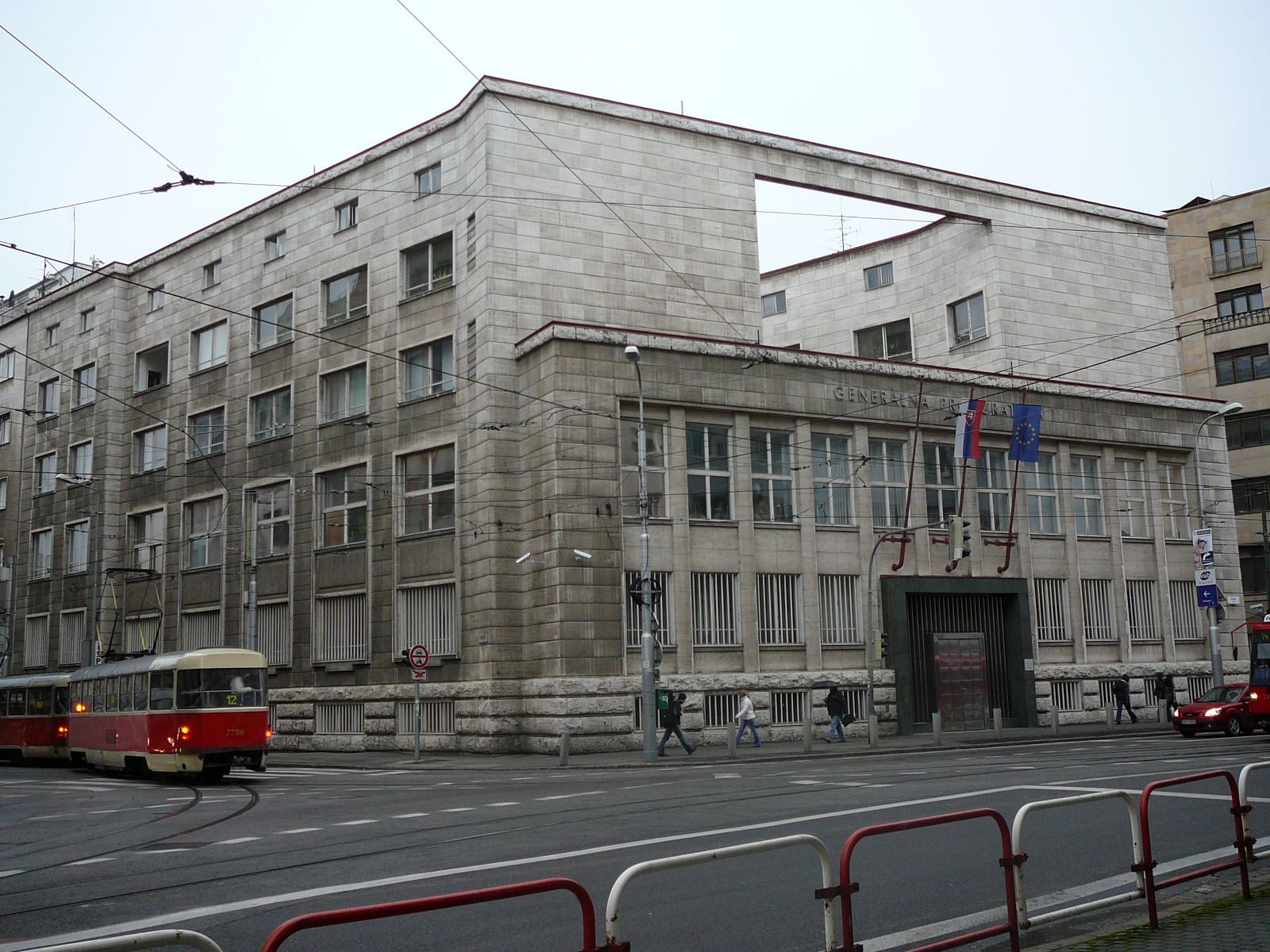
Slovak National Bank by Emil Belluš, 1938

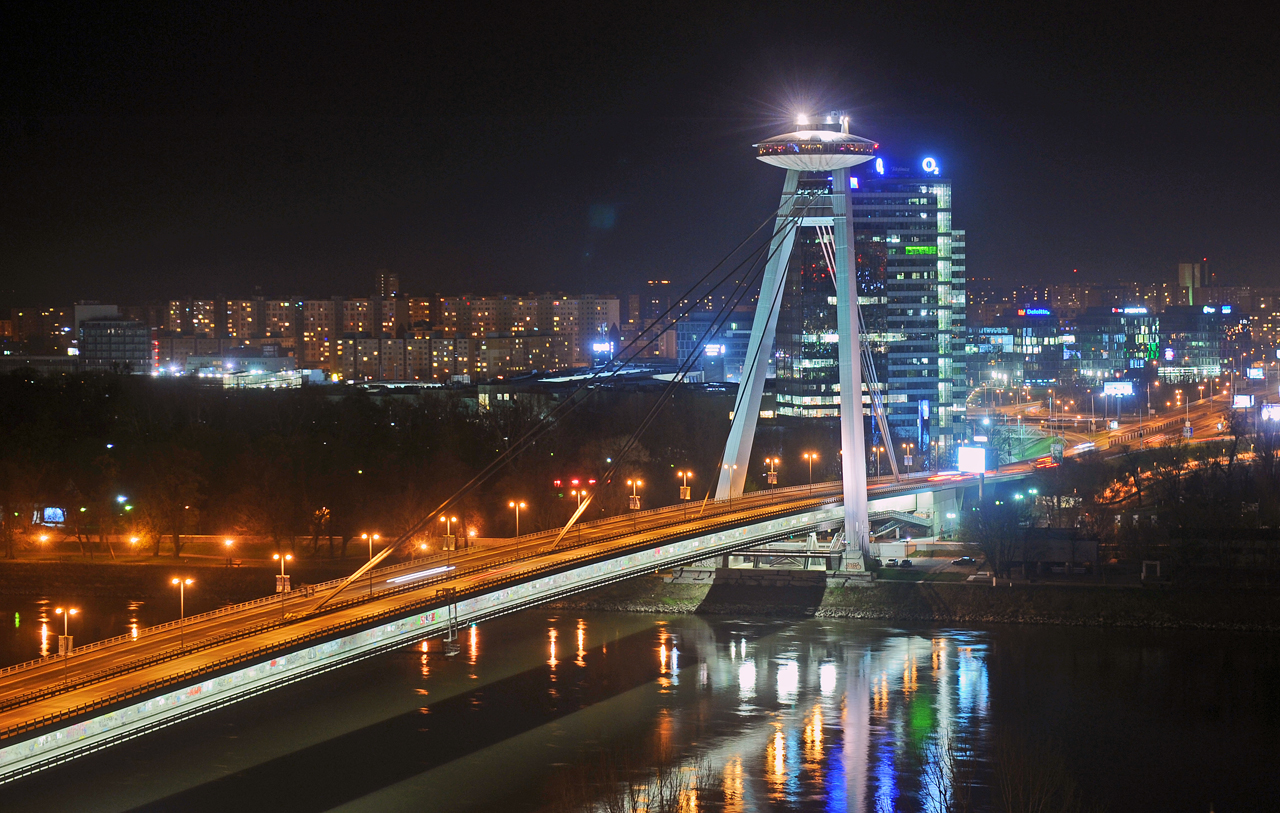
Most SNP, 1967–72

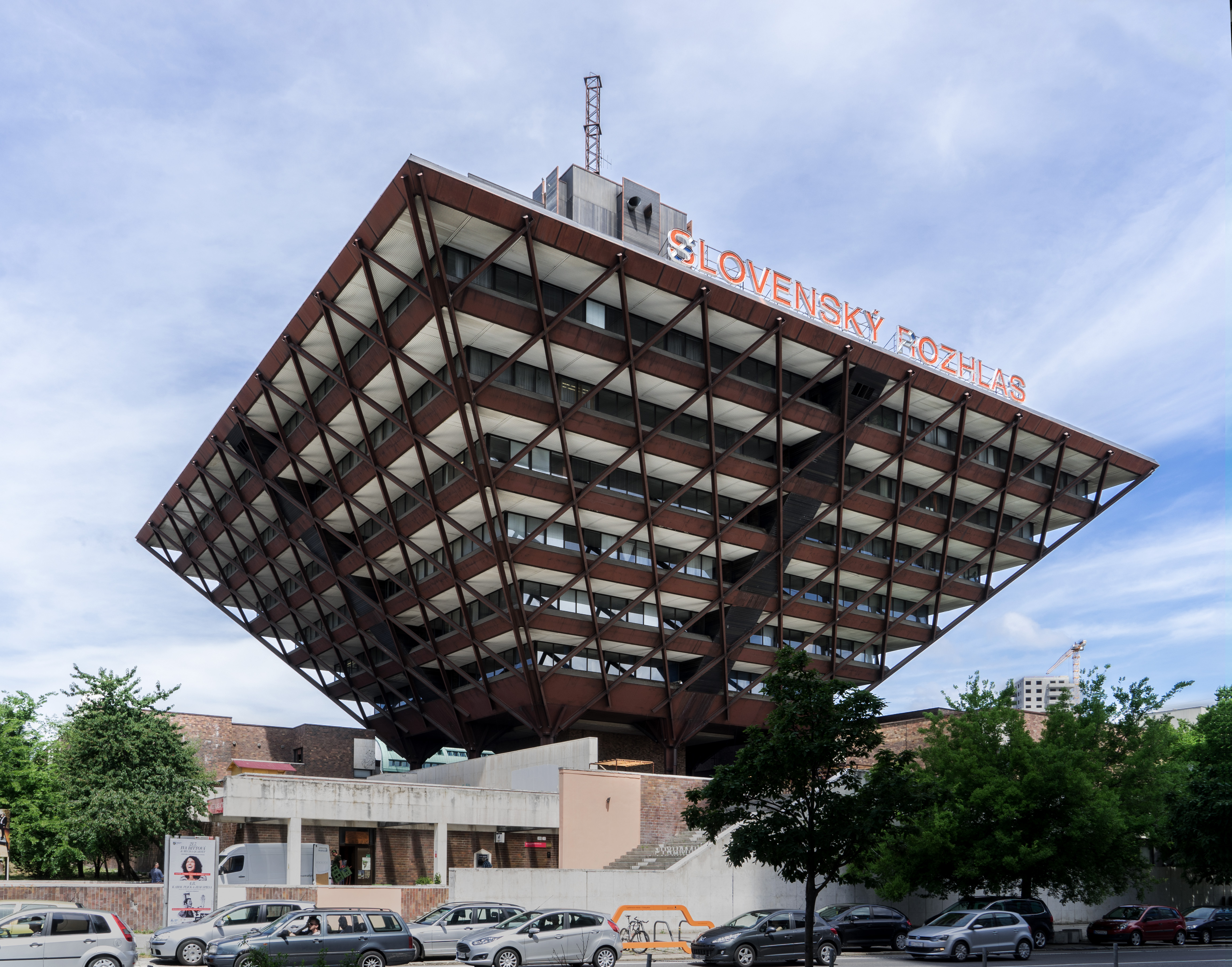
Slovak Radio Building, 1967–83

== Contemporary architecture ==
Following Slovakia's independence in 1993, in the economic and democratic transition and in the run-up and after Slovakia's accession to the European Union in 2004, several modern administrative and business buildings in the style of contemporary architecture were built, in particular in the capital Bratislava:

- VIVO! Bratislava (until 2019 Polus City Center) was the country's first modern shopping mall, opened in November 2000. The centre, with an area of 38,500 m^{2} (414,000 sq ft), houses a hypermarket, a cinema complex, 139 retail shops and several restaurants and bars. Part of the complex are two high-rise office towers: "Millennium Tower I" (80 m (260 ft)) and "Millennium Tower II" (100 m (330 ft)). Construction of a third tower, "Millennium III", is planned.
- The headquarters office building of the National Bank of Slovakia was opened on 23 May 2002: at a height of 111.6 metres and with 33 floors it is the highest building in Bratislava, not including antenna height.
- The Apollo Bridge (Slovak: Most Apollo) over the Danube was built between 2003 and 2005. Its curved lines, inclined arches and virtual absence of right angles make the geometric shape of the bridge very sophisticated. In an unprecedented maneuver, the 5,240-ton steel structure, spanning 231 metres, was rotated across the river from its construction site on the left bank into its final position on a pillar 40 metres from the right bank. The Apollo Bridge was the only European project named one of five finalists for the 2006 Outstanding Civil Engineering Achievement Award (OPAL Award) by the American Society of Civil Engineers.
- The City Business Center, Bratislava is a complex of five buildings in Staré mesto (Old town), first two finished in 2006 and 2007. Construction of the second phase was started in 2008.
- The Eurovea business, retail and residential complex connects the Bratislava Riverfront with the city center and offers stores and leisure time facilities while housing businesses, apartments and a Sheraton hotel. Phase I of the Eurovea complex opened after four years of construction in 2010. Eurovea Phase II will feature the first skyscraper in Slovakia with projected height of 168 meters and 46 floors above the ground with the whole investment estimated at €300 million.
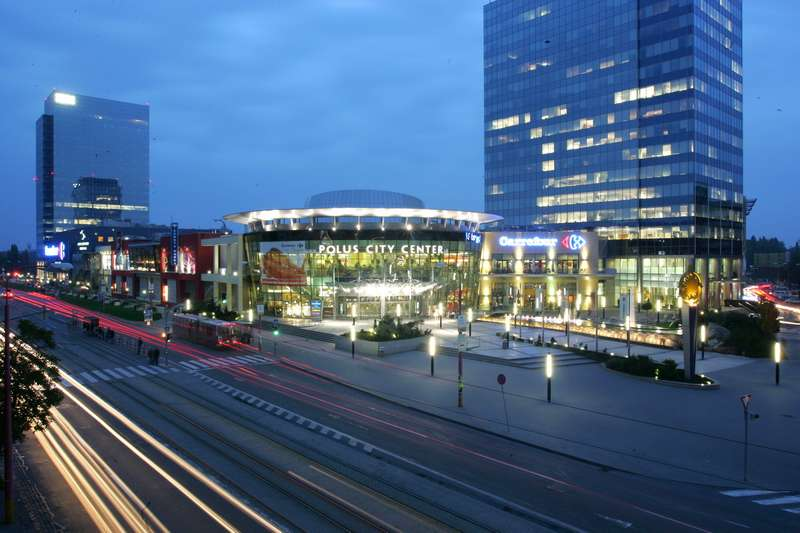
VIVO! Bratislava, 2000

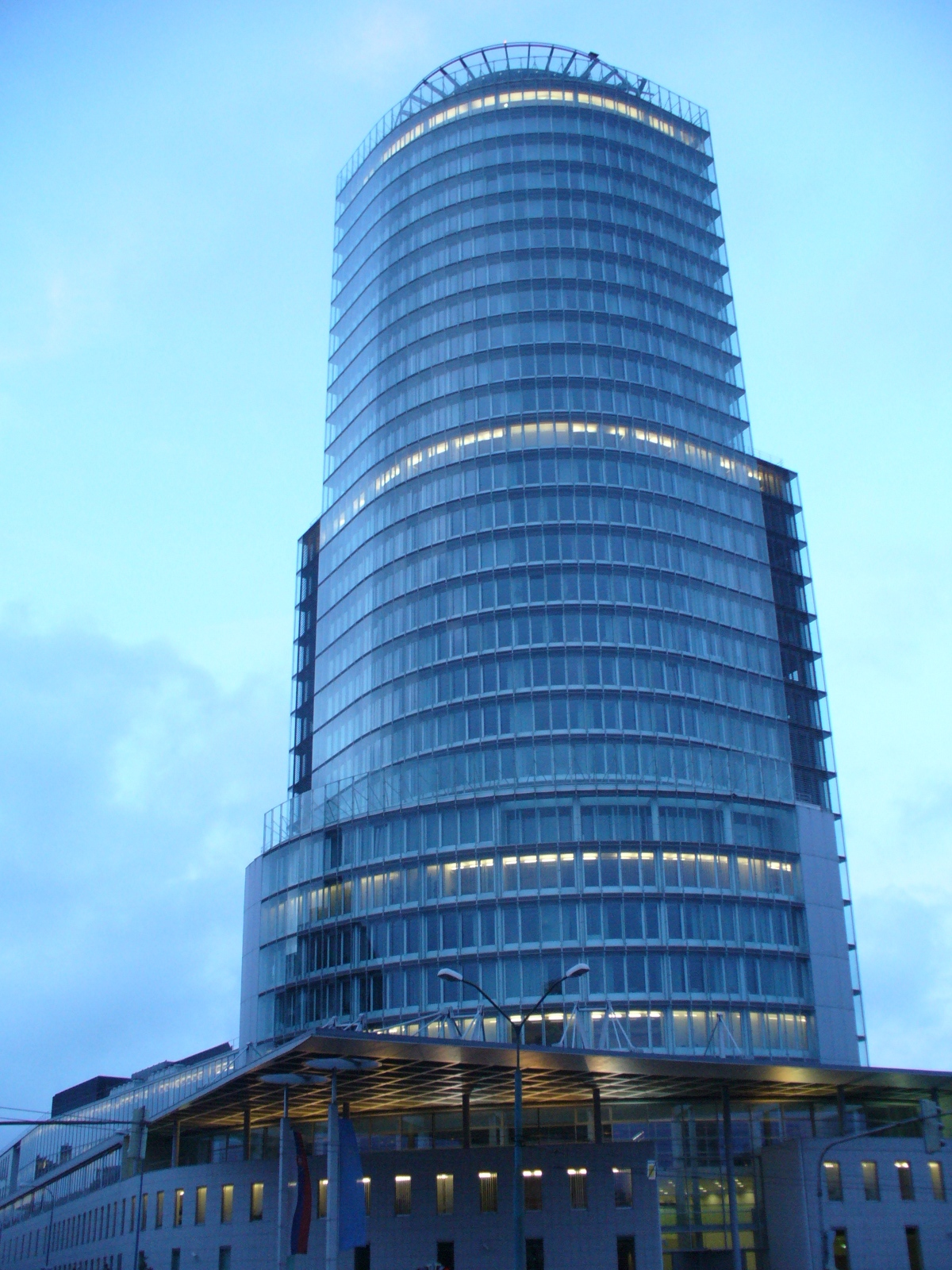
National Bank of Slovakia, 2002

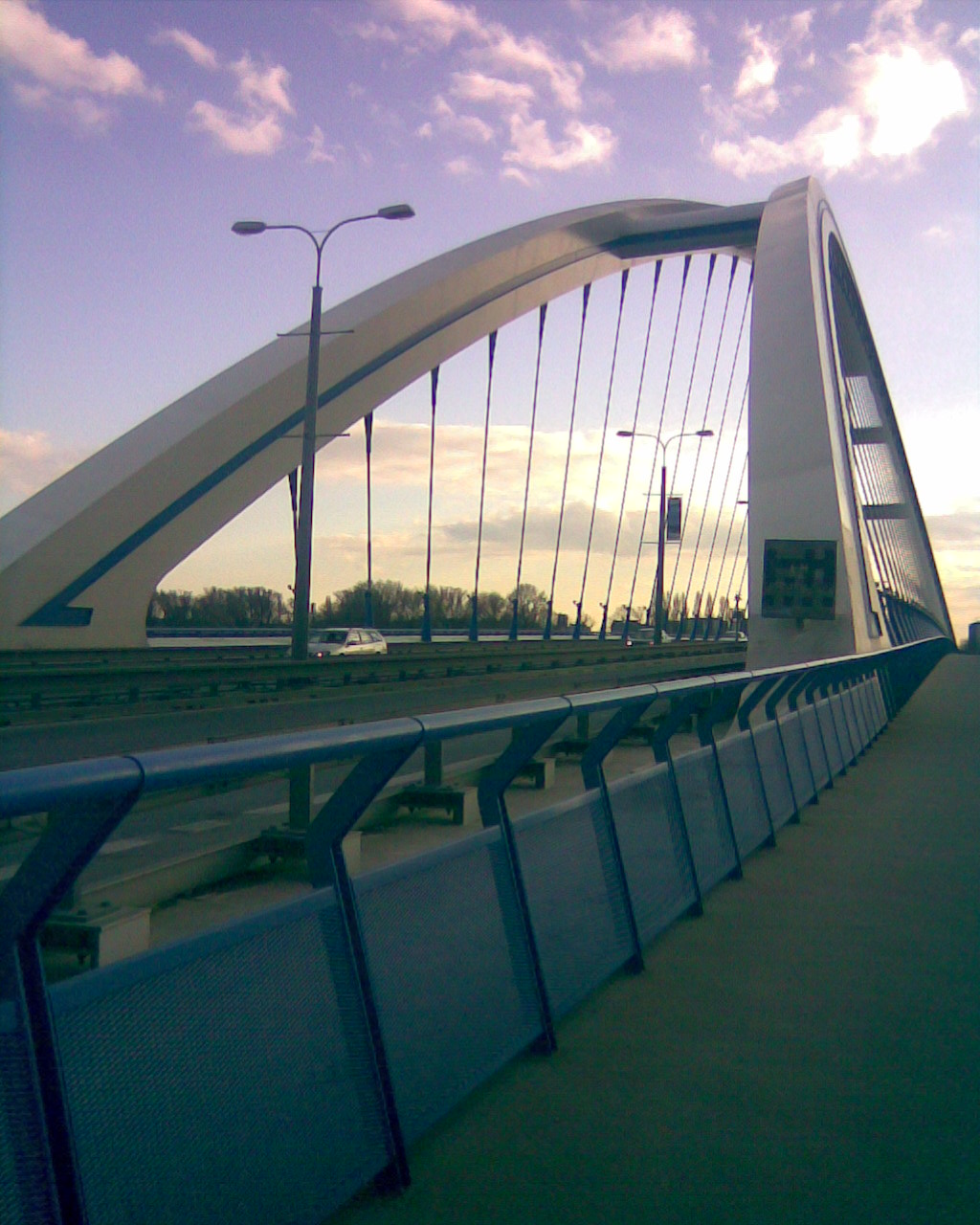
Apollo Bridge, 2003–05

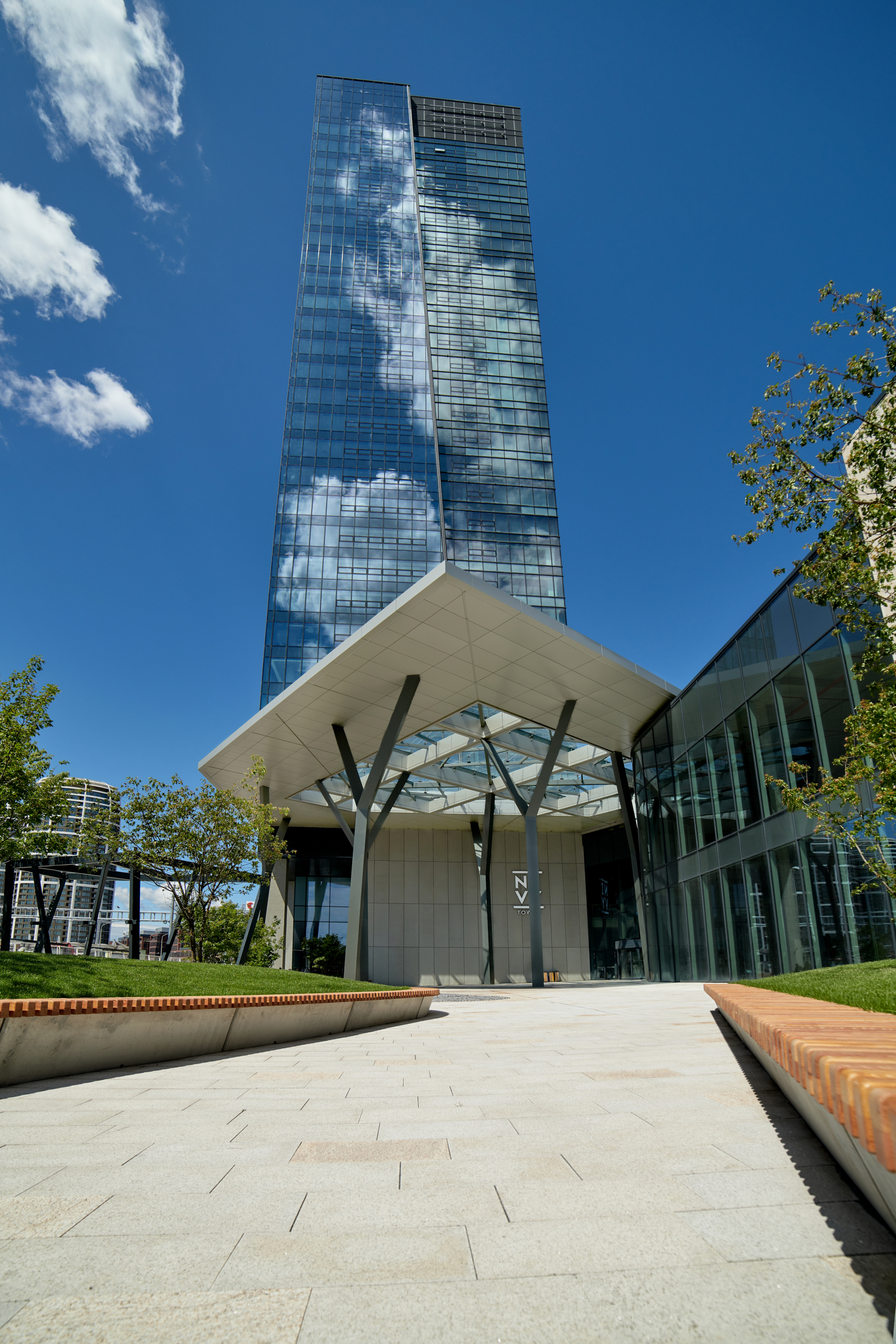
Nivy Tower, 2020

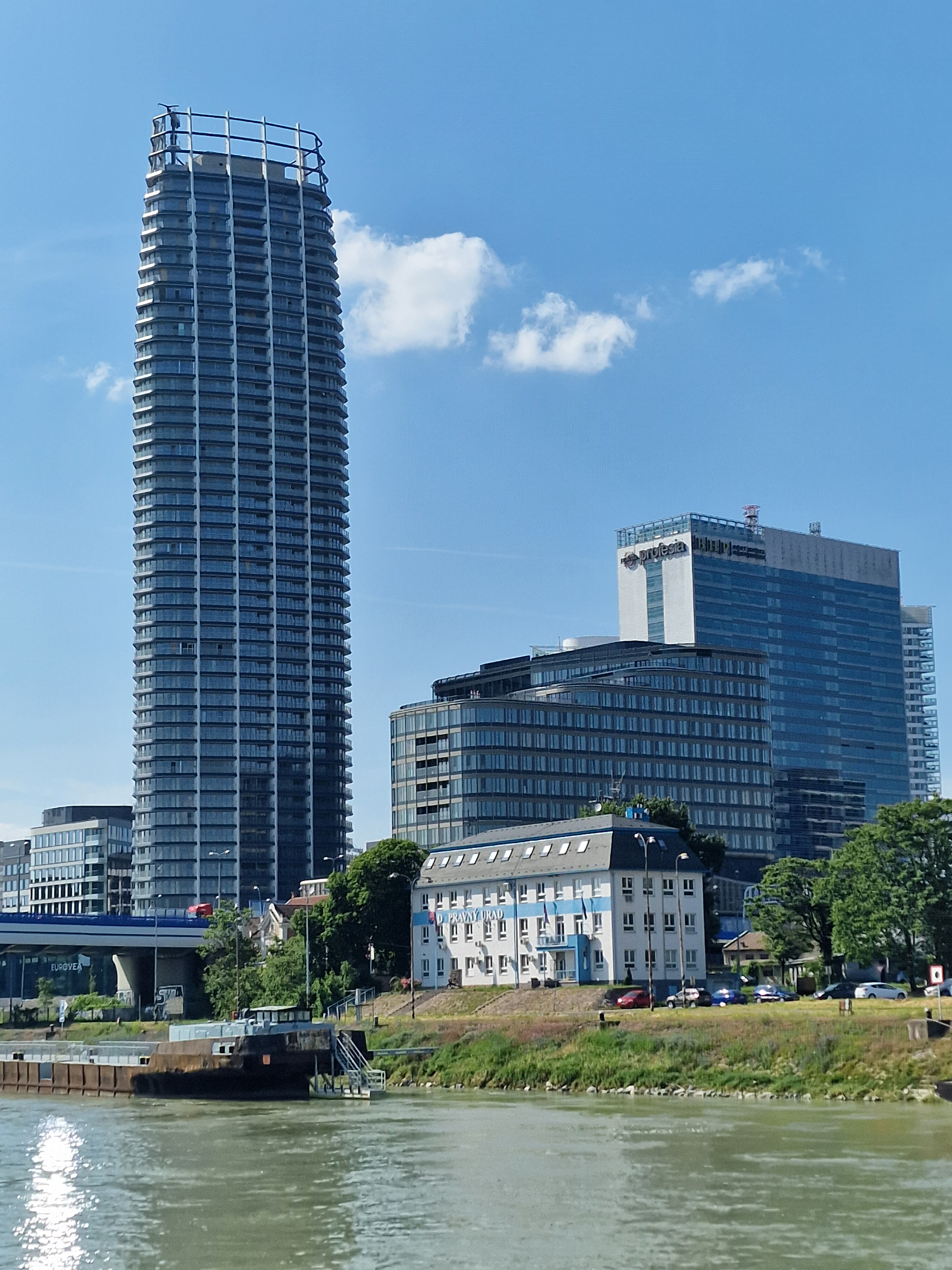
Eurovea Tower, 2023

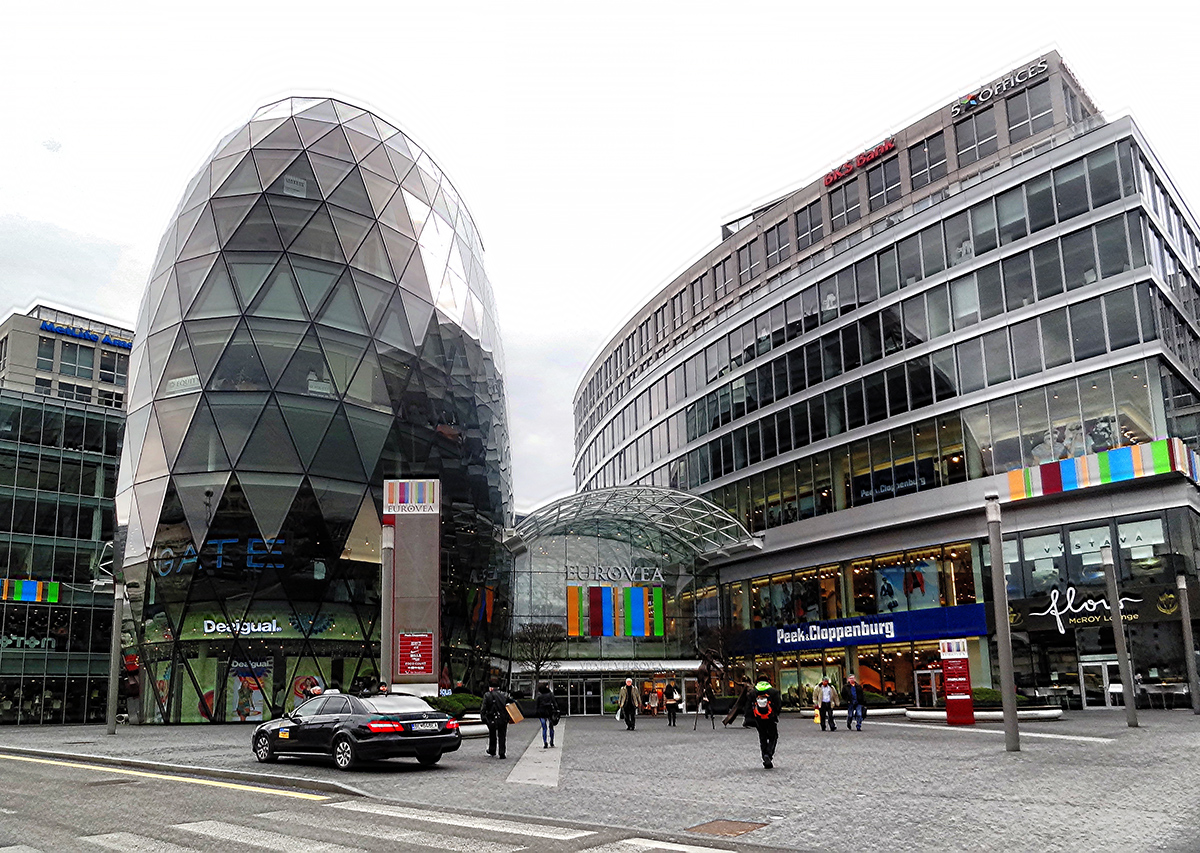
Eurovea, 2010–23

== Bibliography ==
- Hertha Hurnaus, Benjamin Konrad, Maik Novotny (auth.), Eastmodern: Architecture and Design of the 1960s and 1970s in Slovakia, Springer Vienna, 2007, ISBN 978-3-211-71531-4,978-3-211-71532-1
- Maro Borsky, Synagogue Architecture in Slovakia, Univ. Heidelberg, 2005
- Ruttkay, Alexander T. (2014). "The origins of Christianity and early mediaeval sacred architecture in Slovakia – new discoveries and connections". The Cyril and Methodius Mission and Europe: 1150 Years Since the Arrival of the Thessaloniki Brothers in Great Moravia. pp. 120–137. ISBN 978-80-86023-51-9. OS LG 2023-08-18.
