= List of tallest buildings in Slovakia =

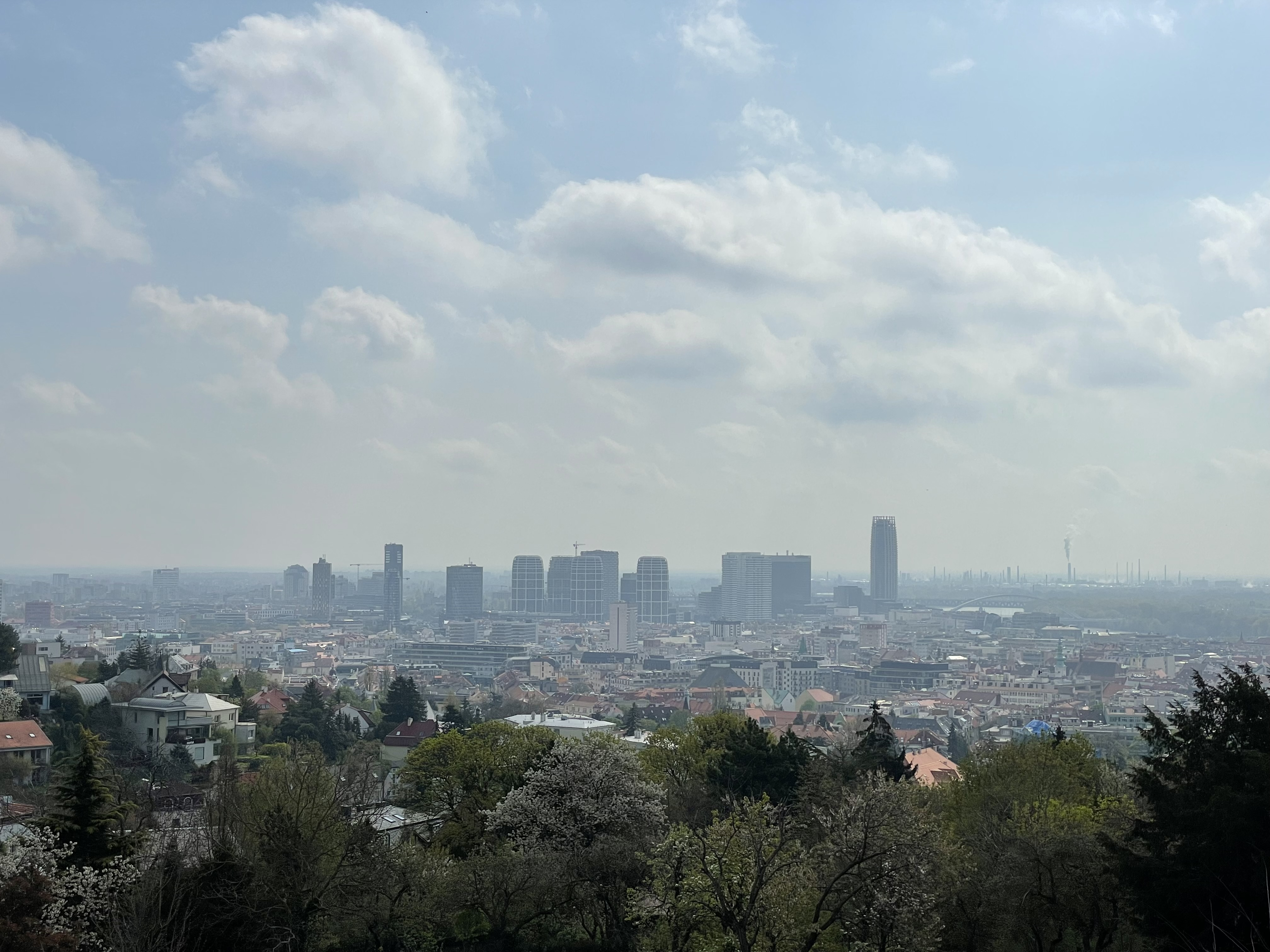
Skyline of Bratislava (2023)

This list of tallest buildings in Slovakia ranks buildings in Slovakia by official height.

The tallest structure in Slovakia is the 318 m (1,043 ft) Dubnik Transmitter and the tallest structure in Bratislava is the Kamzík TV Tower with 196 m (643 ft).

The tallest Slovak skyscraper is Eurovea Tower in Bratislava. It is 168 m (551 ft) tall. First „skyscraper" was Manderlák built in 1935 in Bratislava, it has 12 floors and it is 50 m (160 ft) tall.

Most high-rises are located in Bratislava with few exceptions and all new proposed high-rises are also in the capital city.

== Tallest buildings ==
The following ranks existing buildings over 70 metres (230 ft) in Slovakia by height. This does not include churches.

Name	Image	Height m (ft)	Floors	Year	Location	Notes
Eurovea Tower		168 m (551 ft)	46	2023	Bratislava; 48.13983°N 17.12722°E	The tallest building in Bratislava and subsequently in Slovakia. Also serves as the tallest residential building in the country.
Nivy Tower		125 m (410 ft)	29	2020	Bratislava; 48.14606°N 17.13036°E	The second tallest building and the tallest office building in Slovakia.
Klingerka		116 m (381 ft)	36	2022	Bratislava; 48.14297°N 17.13277°E	The third tallest building in Slovakia and the second tallest residential building.
Panorama City Towers		112.6 m (369 ft); 112.2 m (368 ft)	34	2016	Bratislava; 48.14216°N 17.12600°E	Both of the buildings were topped out in 2015.
National Bank of Slovakia Tower		111 m (364 ft)	33	2002	Bratislava; 48.15307°N 17.11480°E	The second tallest office building in Slovakia.
Slovak Television Building		108 m (354 ft)	27	1974	Bratislava; 48.15672°N 17.07183°E	Slovak Television and Radio TV's headquarters.
City Business Center I		107 m (351 ft)	24	2006	Bratislava; 48.14842°N 17.12560°E	
Sky Park Residence		105 m (344 ft); 105 m (344 ft); 105 m (344 ft); 105 m (344 ft)	31; 31; 31; 31	2020; 2020; 2020; 2024	Bratislava; 48.14371°N 17.12466°E	Four residential buildings by Zaha Hadid Architects.
Tower 115		104 m (341 ft)	28	1984	Bratislava; 48.14134°N 17.1274°E	
Glória		100 m (330 ft)	29	2005	Bratislava; 48.15510°N 17.13846°E	
Millennium Tower II		100 m (330 ft)	23	2003	Bratislava; 48.169886°N 17.140195°E	
Aupark Tower		96 m (315 ft)	22	2007	Bratislava; 48.13418°N 17.10540°E	
Technopol Towers		90 m (300 ft)	20	1984	Bratislava; 48.11143°N 17.11131°E	
City Park Ružinov Tower I		89 m (292 ft)	27	2019	Bratislava; 48.14650°N 17.14286°E	
Twin City Tower		89 m (292 ft)	23	2018	Bratislava; 48.14626°N 17.12470°E	
VÚB Centrála		88 m (289 ft)	23	1996	Bratislava; 48.14687°N 17.12507°E	
Europa Business Center		87 m (285 ft)	22	2008	Banská Bystrica; 48.72960°N 19.13615°E	
Manhattan		86 m (282 ft)	26	2010	Bratislava; 48.16762°N 17.12678°E	
Incheba Building		85 m (279 ft)	19	1967	Bratislava; 48.13384°N 17.09879°E	
Matadorka		85 m (279 ft)	28	2020	Bratislava; 48.12105°N 17.09659°E	
Tower 5		84.5 m (277 ft)	20	2020	Bratislava; 48.16262°N 17.13726°E	Office building, part of the National football stadium.
Centrál		84 m (276 ft)	21	2012	Bratislava; 48.15768°N 17.12976°E	
Danubius One		83 m (272 ft)	26	2023	Bratislava; 48.15783°N 17.13374°E	
Lakeside Park Bratislava		83 m (272 ft)	20	2008	Bratislava; 48.17275°N 17.14303°E	
Louis Pasteur University Hospital		83 m (272 ft)	19	1979	Košice; 48.72257°N 21.23825°E	
Kukurica Tower		82 m (269 ft)	21	1977	Bratislava; 48.16802°N 17.12874°E	
Rozadol		82 m (269 ft)	21	2006	Bratislava; 48.15228°N 17.14150°E	
Dominant Building		80 m (260 ft)	20	2008	Bratislava; 48.12076°N 17.11904°E	
Millennium Tower I		80 m (260 ft)	19	2001	Bratislava; 48.16810°N 17.13901°E	
Sky Park Offices		80 m (260 ft)	18	2021	Bratislava; 48.14335°N 17.12688°E	
Slovak Radio Building		80 m (260 ft)	8	1983	Bratislava; 48.15366°N 17.11415°E	
Amfiteáter		78 m (256 ft)	24	2009	Žilina; 49.20907°N 18.74439°E	
Slovak University of Technology (STU Tower)		78 m (256 ft)	24		Bratislava; 48.15127°N 17.11538°E	
Vienna Gate Bratislava		78 m (256 ft)	22	2008	Bratislava; 48.12149°N 17.09770°E	
City Park Ružinov Tower II		78 m (256 ft)	24	2019	Bratislava; 48.14650°N 17.14286°E	
City Park Ružinov Tower III		76 m (249 ft)	23	2019	Bratislava; 48.14650°N 17.14286°E	
Discovery Residence		75 m (246 ft)	22	2022	Bratislava; 48.14537°N 17.13992°E	
Fuxova Residences		75 m (246 ft)	24	2018	Bratislava; 48.12890°N 17.11856°E	
ESO Office Building		75 m (246 ft)	20	2006	Lučenec; 48.32667°N 19.67069°E	
Europalace		73 m (240 ft)	22	2010	Žilina; 49.21040°N 18.76034°E	
Tri Veže		73 m (240 ft); 73 m (240 ft); 73 m (240 ft)	24; 24; 24	2010; 2010; 2010	Bratislava; 48.16335°N 17.13974°E	
Première Building		72 m (236 ft)	23	2020	Bratislava; 48.15707°N 17.11459°E	
Spectrum Tower		72 m (236 ft)	20	2009	Bratislava; 48.13029°N 17.11633°E	High-rise building in former Tatra City complex.

== Proposed and under construction ==
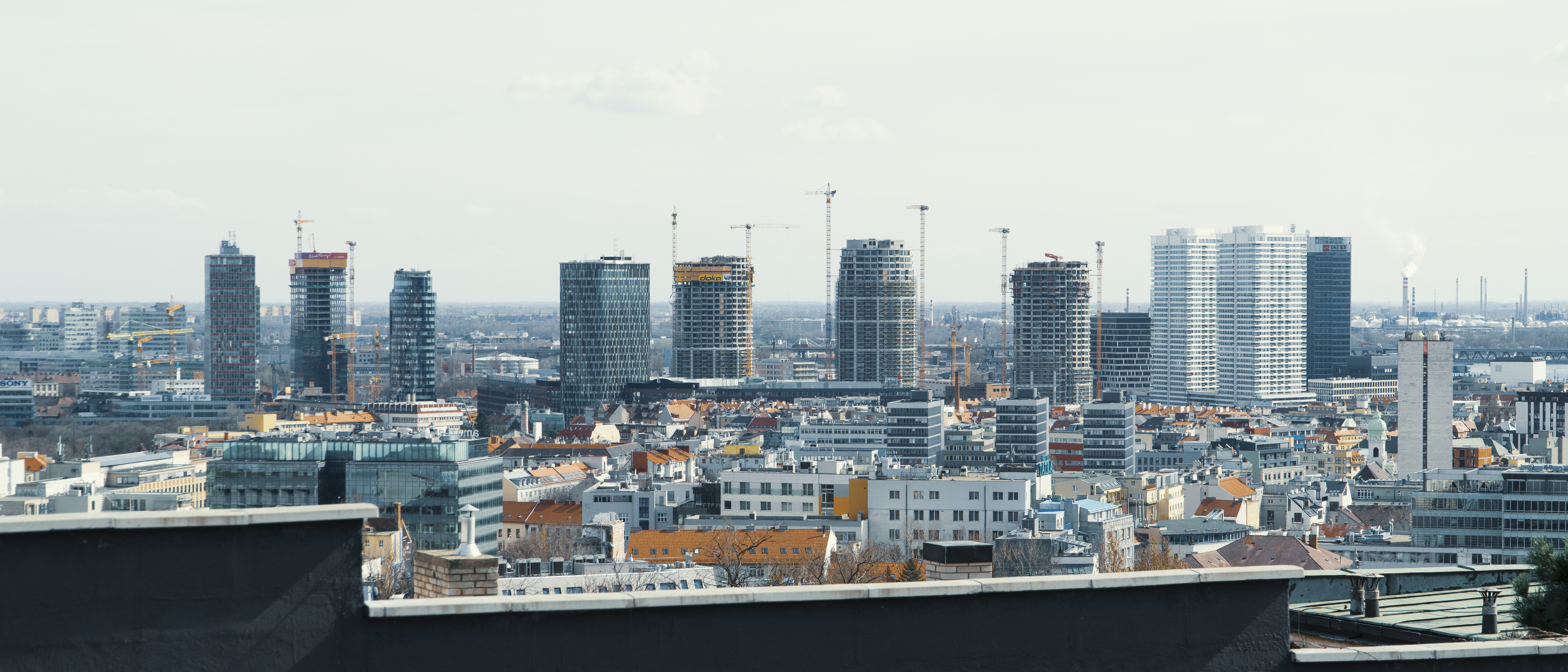
High-rise buildings under construction in Bratislava downtown (2019)

Name	Location	Height meters / feet	Floors above ground	Notes
Untitled Tower I	Bratislava	260 m (850 ft)	N/A	Proposed. Residential building in Eurovea City. Expected completion is 2035+.
Untitled Tower II	Bratislava	180 m (590 ft)	N/A	Proposed. Residential building in Eurovea City. Expected completion is 2035+.
Downtown Yards	Bratislava; 48.14383°N 17.13202°E	141 m (463 ft)	N/A	Proposed. Office building. Expected completion is 2030+.
Sky Park Tower	Bratislava; 48.14283°N 17.12492°E	120 m (390 ft)	N/A	Under construction. Residential building by Zaha Hadid Architects. Tallest Sky Park building, with a different design then the other four identical Sky Park buildings in Bratislava. Expected completion is 2027—2028.
Portum Tower I	Bratislava; 48.14272°N 17.12963°E	117 m (384 ft)	N/A	Proposed. Residential building. Expected completion is 2027—2029.
Ister Tower	Bratislava; 48.14287°N 17.12775°E	103 m (338 ft)	33	Proposed. Residential building. Expected completion is 2027—2029.
New Istropolis	Bratislava; 48.15931°N 17.12658°E	102.5 m (336 ft)	26	Under construction. Office building, part of the new National Cultural & Congress Centre. Expected completion is 2030.
Portum Tower II	Bratislava; 48.14272°N 17.12963°E	99 m (325 ft)	N/A	Proposed. Residential building. Expected completion is 2027—2029.
Chalupkova Tower	Bratislava	N/A	N/A	Proposed. Expected completion is 2030+.
Southbank Tower I	Bratislava	N/A	N/A	Proposed. Expected completion is 2030+.
Southbank Tower II	Bratislava	N/A	N/A	Proposed. Expected completion is 2030+.

== Timeline of the tallest buildings ==
This lists high-rise buildings that once held the title of tallest building in Slovakia. This does not include churches.

Name	Image	Years as tallest	Height ft (m)	Floors
Eurovea Tower		2023–present	168 m (551 ft)	46
Nivy Tower		2020–2023	125 m (410 ft)	29
Panorama City Towers		2015–2020	112.6 m (369 ft)	34
National Bank of Slovakia Tower		2002–2015	111 m (364 ft)	33
Slovak Television Building		1974–2002	108 m (354 ft)	27
Incheba Building		1967–1974	85.6 m (281 ft)	19
Manderlák		1935–1967	45 m (148 ft)	11

== See also ==
- High-rise building
- List of tallest buildings in Bratislava
- List of tallest structures in Slovakia
- Skyscraper
