= VÚB Centrála =

Skyscraper in Bratislava

- Budova centrály VÚB (Slovak)
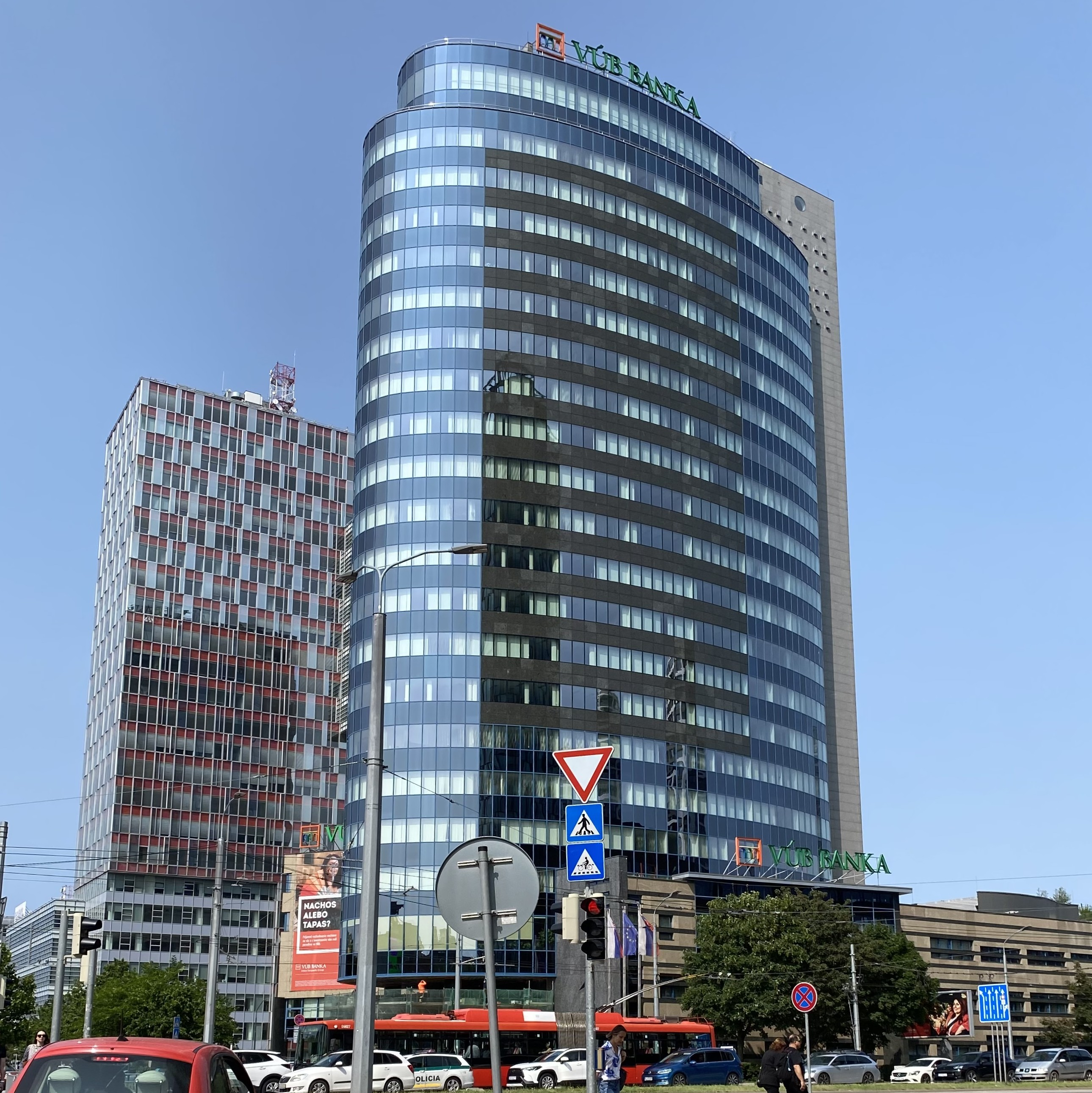
- Interactive map of the VÚB Centrála area

General information
- Status: Completed
- Type: Office
- Location: Ružinov, Bratislava, Slovakia, Mlynské nivy, 811 09 Ružinov, Bratislava
- Coordinates: 48.14687°N 17.12507°E
- Construction started: 1994
- Completed: 1996

Height
- Roof: 88.1 m (289 ft)

Technical details
- Structural system: Concrete
- Floor count: 23

Design and construction
- Architect: Ján Miloslav Bahna

The VÚB Centrála is a high-rise office building in Bratislava, Slovakia. Standing at 88.1 m (289 ft) tall with a total of 23 floors, the building was inaugurated in 1996 and it currently serves as the headquarters of the Všeobecná úverová banka (Vúb Banka).

== History ==
=== Architecture ===
Designed by Slovak architect Ján Miloslav Bahna, the building presents a cylindrical volume, with an all-concrete structure and facade finishes of marble, Brazilian granite and green onyx. The main entrance of the building is at the middle of the ground zero.

The first level of the building is a spacious hall and a gallery placed on eight columns of elliptical cross-section. The columns pass in a high row through the three representative floors of the bank. The circular staircase at the edge of the entrance hall overcomes the same height difference. The platform of the elevator is located in the axis of the staircase. It rises up in front of the facade with a segment of a cylinder and culminates in a roof superstructure in the shape of a glass cone. The internal cafe is located in the front arch of the ellipse and offers a view of the main entrance right on the floor plan. Standard bank administration occupies most of the floors. In return, the front arch of the elliptical floor plan is dedicated to large-scale offices.

The rear part of the tower is actually a communication core with two staircases and six elevators, the side areas of the tower are made up of offices of individual managers. Geometrically integrated ellipses and a symmetrical composition characterize the high-rise building both in terms of layout and exterior design. The slight recess of the facade passing through the four floors on the north side makes the smooth body of the cylinder special. It is highlighted by a simple stone vertical. The last two floors are deviated from the usual scheme by providing space for a swimming pool with accessories and a panoramic view of Bratislava.

== See also ==
- List of tallest buildings in Slovakia
- List of tallest buildings in Bratislava
