= Glória (Bratislava) =

High-rise building in Bratislava, Slovakia

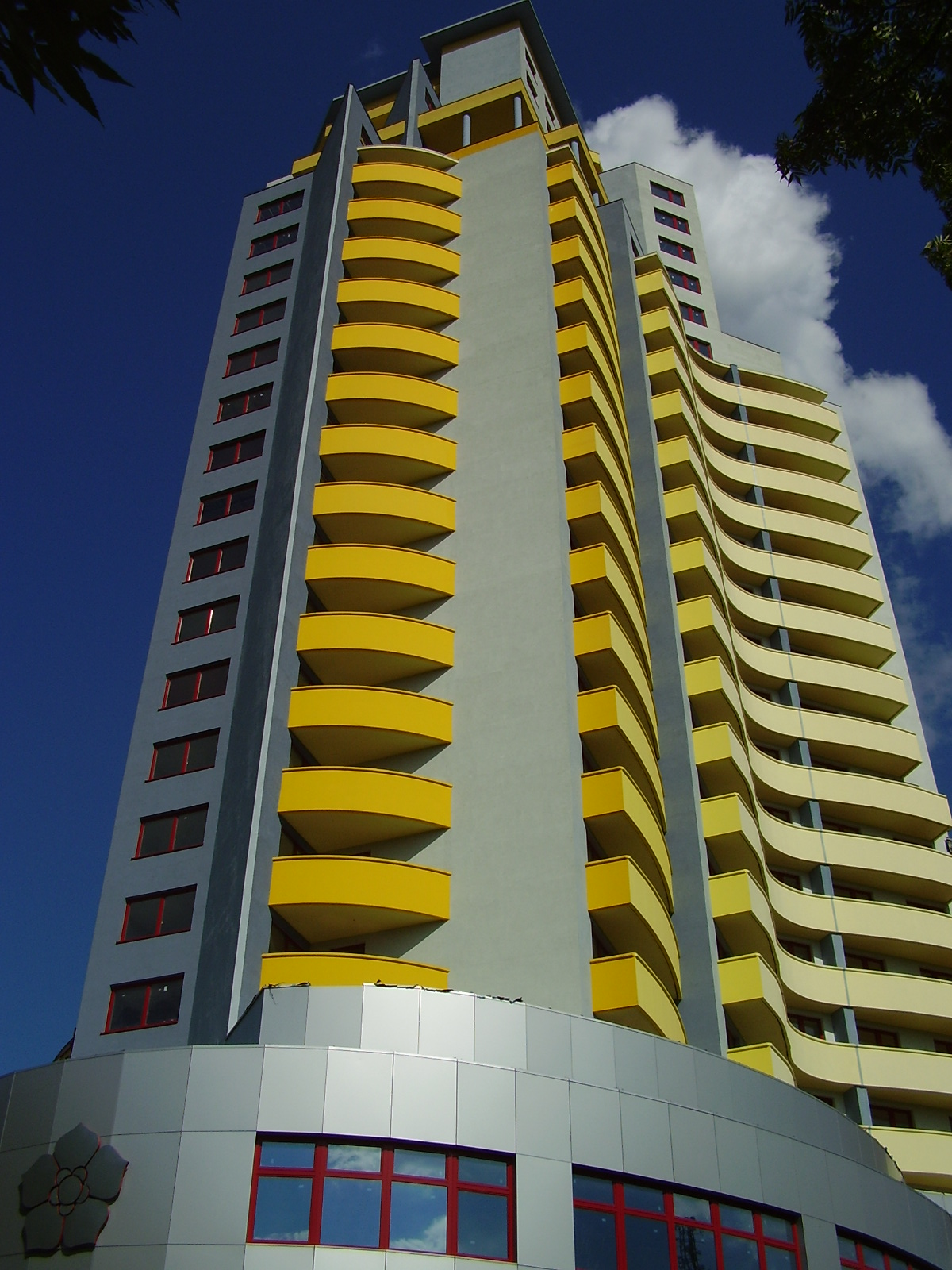
- Interactive map of the Glória area

General information
- Status: Completed
- Type: Residential
- Location: Ružinov, Bratislava, Slovakia, Záhradnícka Street, 821 08 Ružinov, Bratislava
- Coordinates: 48.15510°N 17.13846°E
- Construction started: 2004
- Completed: 2006

Height
- Roof: 100 m (330 ft)

Technical details
- Structural system: Concrete
- Floor count: 29 (+1 underground)
- Lifts/elevators: 2

Design and construction
- Architects: Peter Gál & Juraj Furdík

Glória is a high-rise residential building located on the Záhradnícka Street in the Ružinov district of Bratislava, Slovakia. The construction stands at 100 metres (328 ft) tall with 29 floors and was built between 2004 and 2006.

== History ==
=== Architecture ===
The building has 29 above-ground and one underground floor and it hosts a total of 79 apartments. The smallest one-bedroom apartment has an area of 50 square meters and the largest duplex on the upper floors is 375 square meters. The building includes two separate high-speed elevators controlled by a computer, underground garages and parking spaces and new types of wood-aluminum Euro windows. The architects and authors of the building are Peter Gál and Juraj Furdík.

Glória won the Residential House of the Year competition in 2005. In the Trend reality survey in October 2010, it was voted as the ugliest new building in Slovakia.

== See also ==
- List of tallest buildings in Slovakia
- List of tallest buildings in Bratislava

== Gallery ==
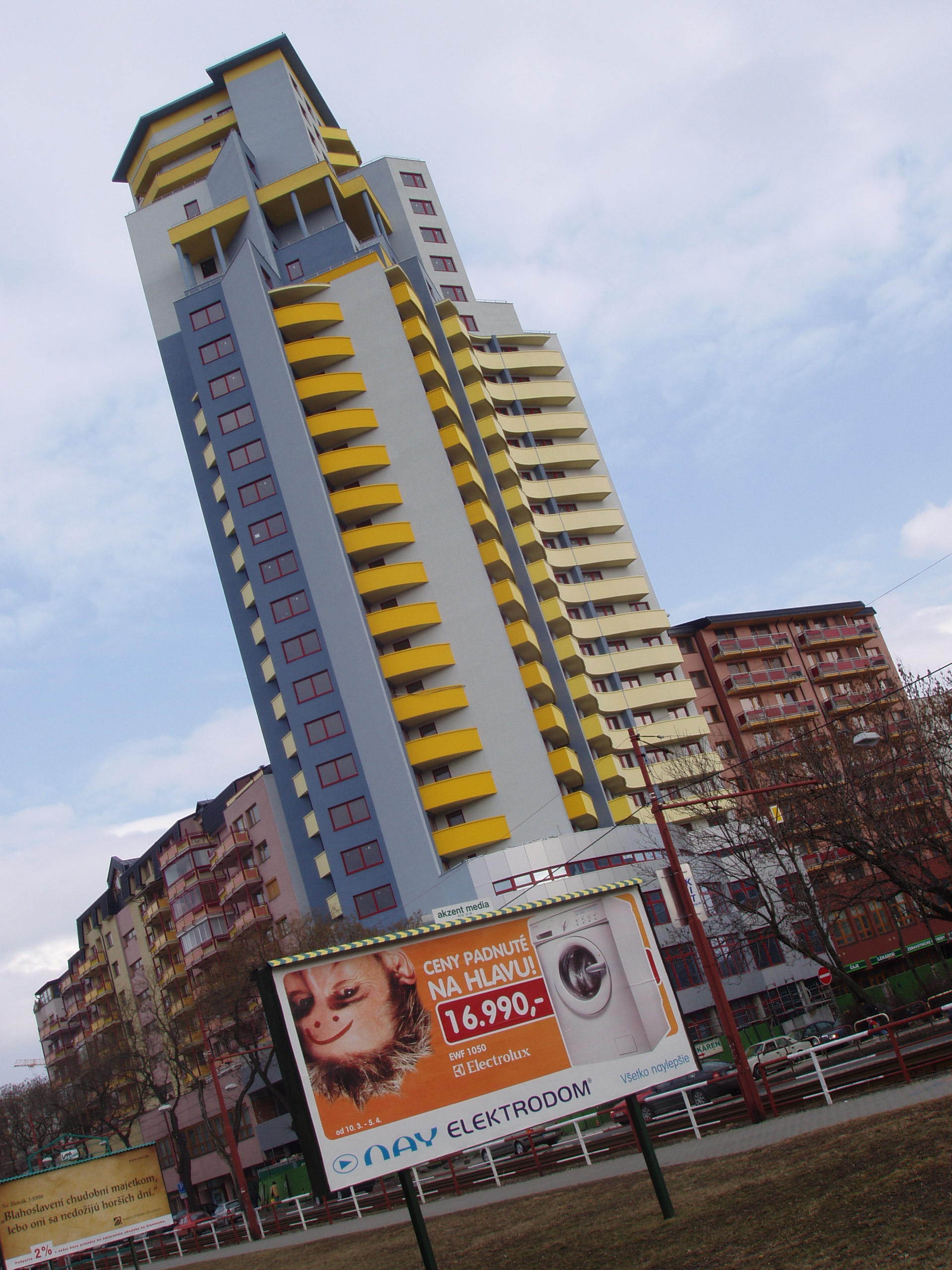
Glória seen from the Jégeho street
