= Nivy Tower =

Skyscraper in Bratislava

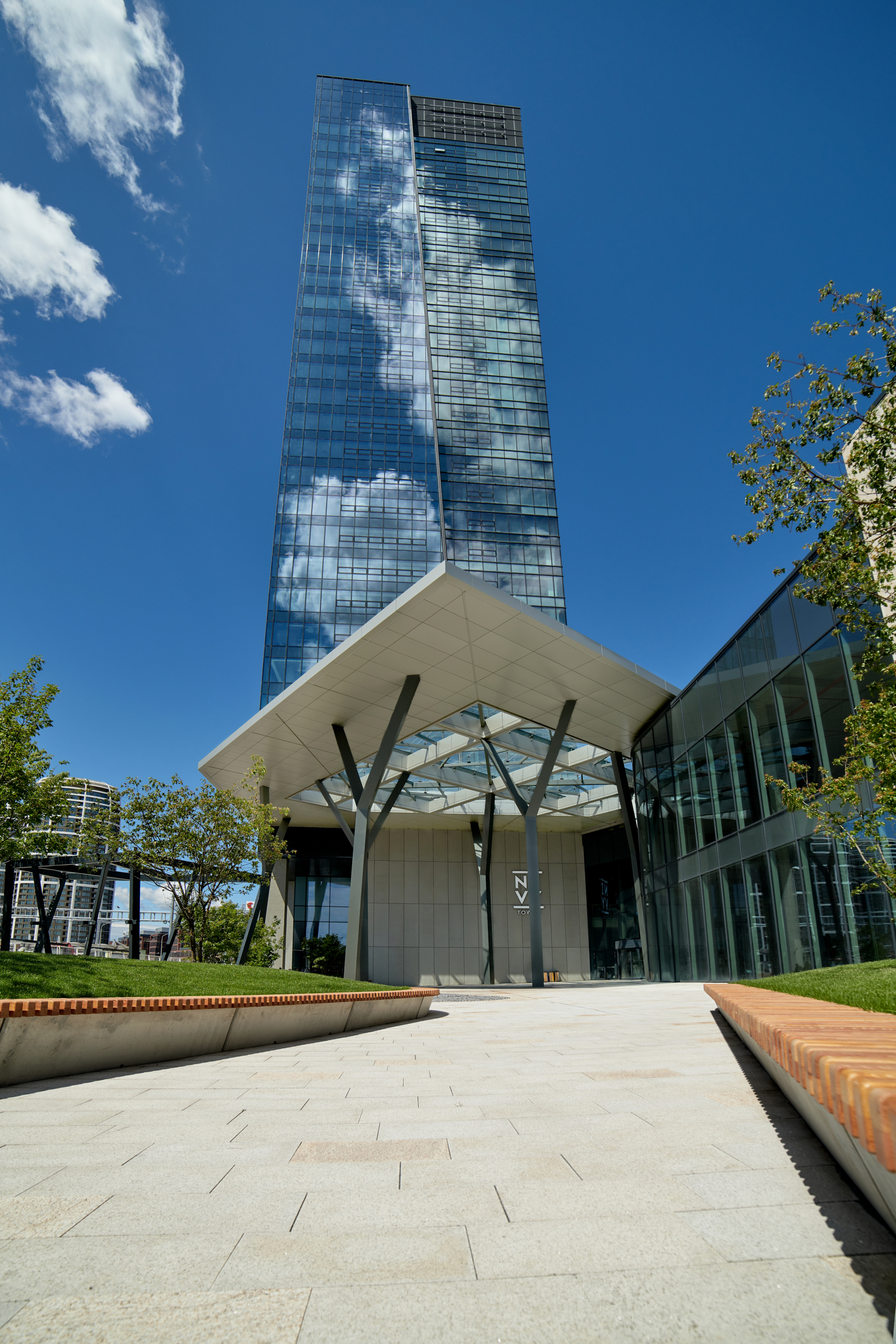

General information
- Status: Completed
- Type: Office
- Location: Ružinov, Bratislava, Slovakia, Mlynské nivy 18890/5, 821 09 Ružinov, Slovakia
- Coordinates: 48.14606°N 17.13036°E
- Construction started: 2017
- Completed: 2020

Height
- Roof: 125 m (410 ft)

Technical details
- Structural system: Concrete
- Floor count: 29
- Floor area: 31,900 m^{2} (343,000 sq ft) (office)

Design and construction
- Architects: Benoy & Siebert + Talaŝ
- Developer: HB Reavis

Website
- Nivy Tower

The Nivy Tower is a high-rise office skyscraper in Bratislava, Slovakia. Inaugurated in 2020, the building stands at 125 metres (410 ft) tall, being divided into 29 floors, and is the second tallest building in Bratislava and subsequently in Slovakia. The tower was the tallest building in Slovakia between 2020 and 2023, being succeeded by the Eurovea Tower.

== History ==
=== Architecture ===
The Nivy Tower is part of a large modern business complex situated in Downtown Bratislava. The design of the landmark has been conceived by British architecture firm Benoy and Slovak studio Siebert + Talaŝ who also worked on the design of the new Stanica Nivy quarter. The complex also consists of a five floor shopping mall, a modern market hall with a fresh market section and office building represented by the Nivy Tower itself. The quarter provides almost 75,000 m^{2} of retail spaces and around 30,000 m^{2} of office space. The international bus station is a major 20,000-capacity transport facility with constant passenger flow.

Throughout the execution of the building, emphasis was made on efficient use of energy and the accomplishment of the highest levels of sustainability benchmarks. The property was rated by the application of the building assessment system BREEAM (Building Research Establishment Environmental Assessment Method).

The tower was built between 2017 and 2020. All the facades of the building are glass-made and the volumerty of the construction resembles the aspect of a peeled crystal.

== See also ==
- List of tallest buildings in Slovakia
- List of tallest buildings in Bratislava

Records
Preceded by Panorama City Towers	Tallest building in Slovakia; 2020–2023	Succeeded by Eurovea Tower
