= Polus (shopping mall) =

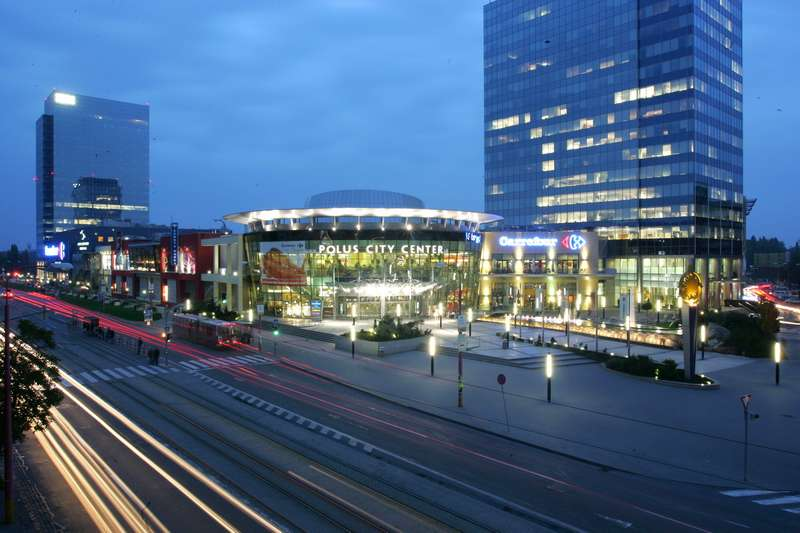
- Polus as seen from Vajnorská Street
- Location: Nové Mesto, Bratislava, Slovakia
- Coordinates: 48°10′07″N 17°08′24″E
- Address: Vajnorská Street No. 100
- Opened: 22 November 2000; 25 years ago
- Developer: TriGránit Development Corporation
- Owner: Wood & Company (2025–)
- Architect: Fischer s.r.o. / Adamson Associates Canada
- Num. of stores: 166
- Floor area: 40,279 square metres (433,559.5 sq ft)
- Floors: 2
- Parking: underground garage and roof parking (1683 spaces)
- Website: www.polus.sk

Polus (until 7 November 2019 Polus City Center, until 21 April 2026 VIVO! Bratislava) is a shopping mall in Bratislava, Slovakia. When it opened in November 2000, it was the country's first modern shopping mall.

The centre, with an area of 38,500 m^{2} (414,000 sq ft), houses a hypermarket, a cinema complex, 139 retail shops and several restaurants and bars. Part of the complex are two high-rise office towers: "Millennium Tower I" (80 m (260 ft)) and "Millennium Tower II" (100 m (330 ft)). Construction of a third tower, "Millennium III", is planned.
