= Tower 115 =

Skyscraper in Bratislava

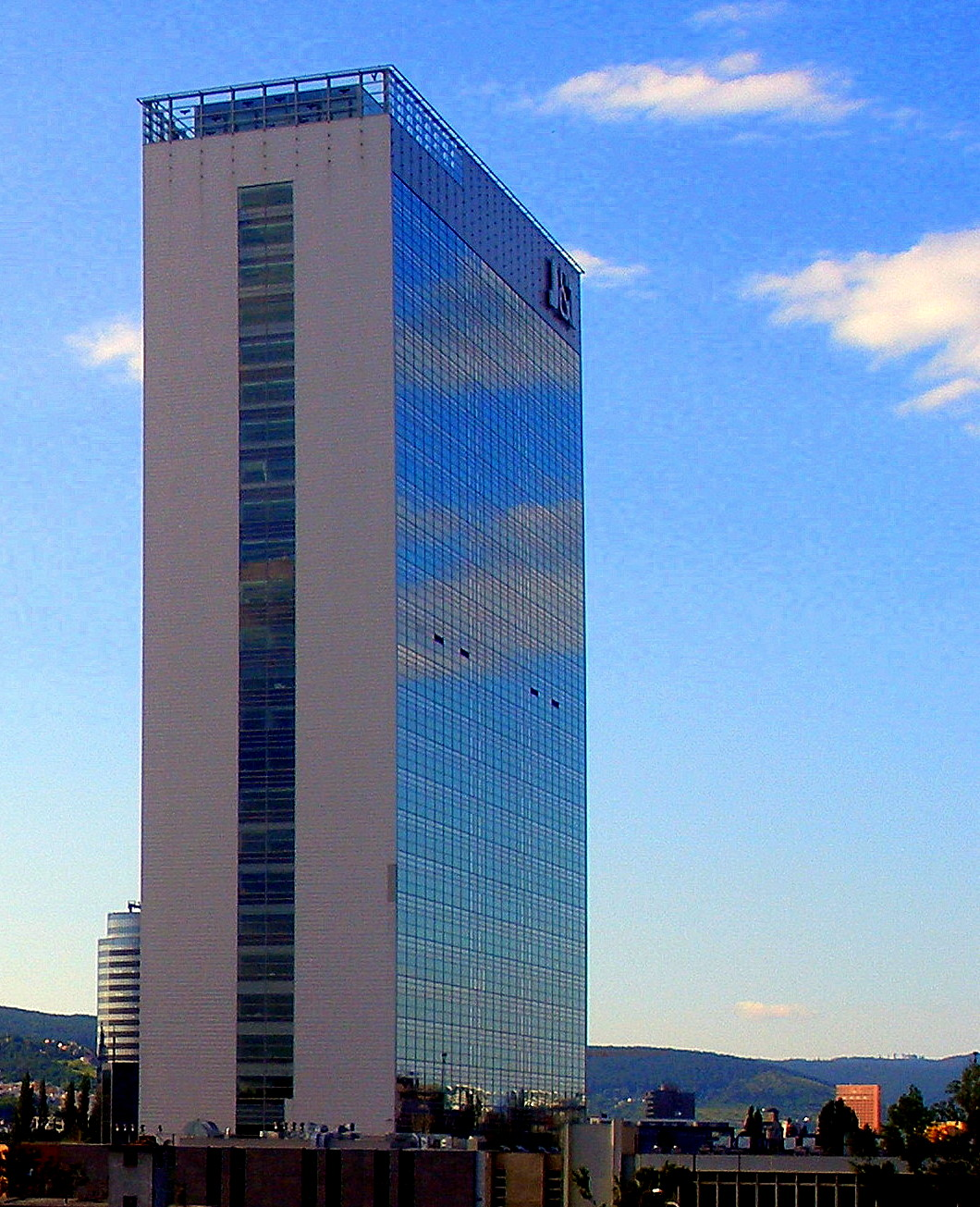
- Interactive map of the Tower 115 area

General information
- Status: Completed
- Type: Office
- Location: Old Town, Bratislava, Slovakia, 25 Pribinova Street, Bratislava
- Coordinates: 48.14134°N 17.1274°E
- Construction started: 1982
- Completed: 1984
- Owner: Prvá Penzijná Správcovská Spoločnosť Poštovej Banky, správ. spol., a. s. CEETA (current)

Height
- Roof: 104 m (341 ft)

Technical details
- Structural system: Concrete
- Floor count: 28
- Floor area: 33,400 m^{2} (360,000 sq ft) (office space)

Design and construction
- Developer: J&T Real Estate, a.s. (reconstruction)

Website
- tower115.sk/en/

Tower 115 (formerly known as the Presscentrum, since 1991 until 2002 Slovakopress and since 2002 until 2006 Pressburg centrum) is a high-rise office skyscraper in Bratislava, Slovakia. Standing at 104 metres (341 ft) tall (the often mentioned height of 115 metres is including the antenna added after reconstruction in 2006), the building is divided into 28 floors. Tower 115 is part of the Eurovea City complex.

== History ==
=== Architecture ===
The construction of the building was mostly completed in 1984 after two years of work. In time, the landmark has gradually undergone various modernizations. Between the years 2004 and 2006, extensive reconstruction and modernization of the building took place. Its external appearance was also changed alongside the building's proper name to the present form of Tower 115.

The roof height of the building is 104 metres (341 ft). In 2006, a transmitter antenna was placed on the roof, aspect which raised the total height of the building to 115 metres (377 ft), hence the name of the tower.

=== Renovation ===
The building was reinaugurated in 2008 when it was included in the Eurovea City project. The building was renovated by J&T REAL ESTATE under an investment loan of € 44 million arranged by the General Loan Bank. In the present days, the building is owned by CEETA Company. Since 2006, JTRE continuously modernized the internal equipment in the building in order to keep up with the norms of CO_{2} emissions. The tower's annual electricity consumption is 4.7 gigawatt-hours (GWh).

== See also ==
- List of tallest buildings in Slovakia
- List of tallest buildings in Bratislava
