= Slovak Television Building =

Skyscraper in Bratislava

- Budova Slovenskej televízie (Slovak)
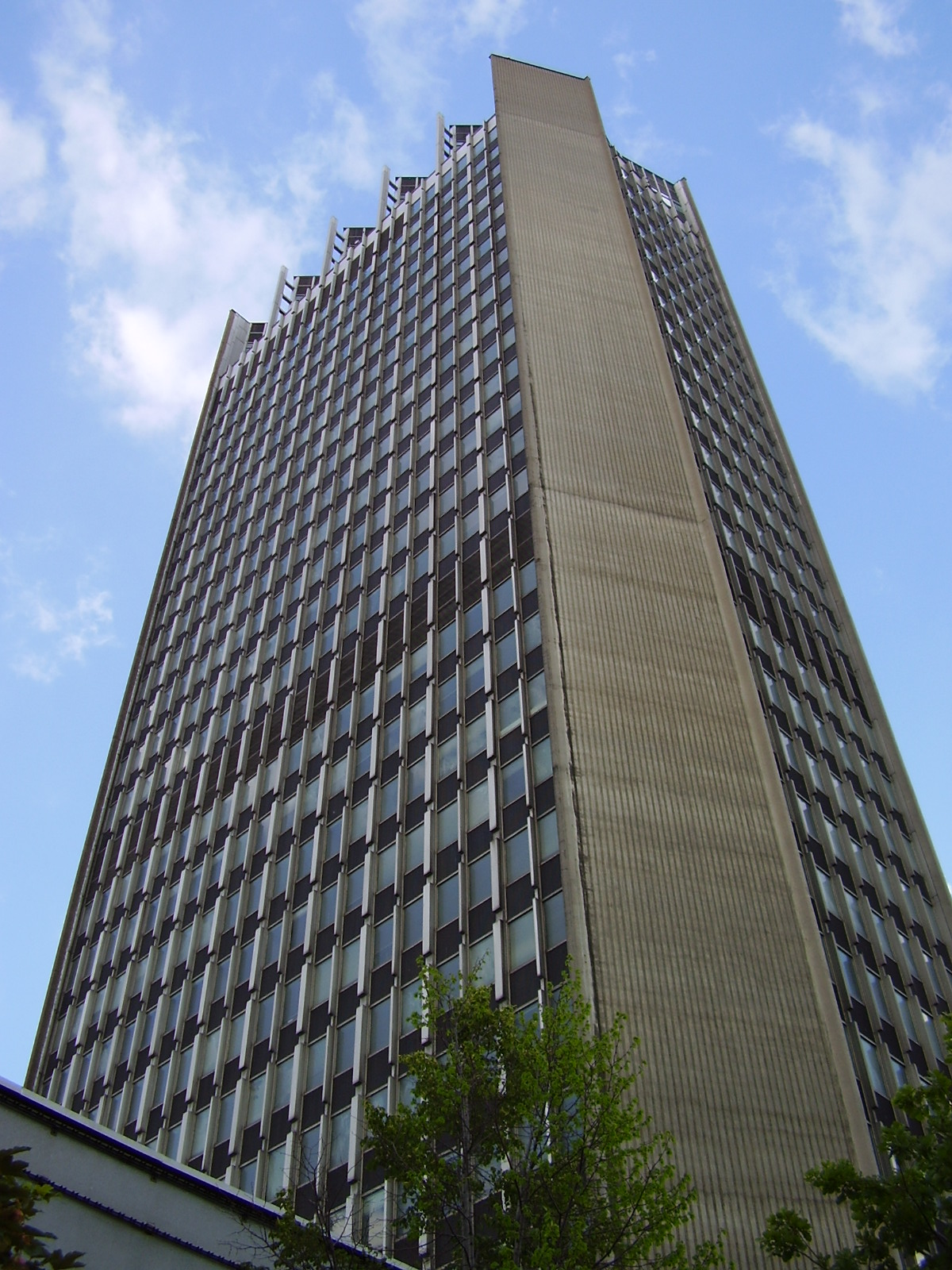
- Interactive map of the Slovak Television Building area

General information
- Status: Completed
- Location: Bratislava, Karlova Ves, Slovakia, 845 45 Bratislava, Mlynská dolina 1
- Coordinates: 48.15672°N 17.07183°E
- Construction started: 1965
- Completed: 1974

Height
- Roof: 108 m (354 ft)

Technical details
- Structural system: Concrete
- Floor count: 27 (+1)

Design and construction
- Architects: Jozef Struhař, Václav Čurilla, Maňková
- Developer: Slovenská televízia (1975–2011); Radio and Television of Slovakia (2011–present)
- Structural engineer: Stavoindustria Bratislava

The Slovak Television Building (Slovak: Budova Slovenskej televízie) (formerly known as the BTP ČST Bratislava between 1975 and 1991, and BTP STV or colloquially STV/RTVS High-rise Building between 1991 and 2011) is a skyscraper in Bratislava, Slovakia. Standing at a total of 108 metres (354 ft) tall and being divided into 27 (+1) floors, the landmark tower is currently unused. It previously hosted the headquarters of the Slovak National Television (STV) and Radio and Television of Slovakia (RTVS).

== History ==
The building is situated in the cadastral territory of the Karlova Ves borough from the Bratislava 4 district, in Mlynská dolina. It was ceremonially opened on December 11, 1975 and has a total of 27 (+1) floors and a height of 108 meters. It was the first high-rise building in Czechoslovakia with a height of over 100 meters as well as the tallest building in the country as overall. It also held a 28-year record for the tallest building in Slovakia between 1974 and 2002.

=== Architecture ===
In 1961, chief architect Jozef Struhař was the winner of the architectural competition for the new complex of Slovak Television, which until then was based in several places in Bratislava. With this, he became the architect of the entire Slovak Television complex. On April 5, 1956, the construction of the premises of Slovak Television in Mlynská dolina began. The first stage of the project was completed on November 25, 1970. The second stage with the high-rise building was completed on December 11, 1975 (the building was topped out and completed in 1974), on the occasion of the 30th anniversary of the Slovak National Uprising. The third stage of the complex was completed in 1981.

Currently, the high-rise building is unused and preserved, with maintenance costs kept to minimal. The employees who still worked there until 2015 were moved to the former health center, which also belonged to the television station and which was converted into an administrative part. On the 28th floor, there was a restaurant, which, like the rest of the building, remained abandoned.

== Panorama ==
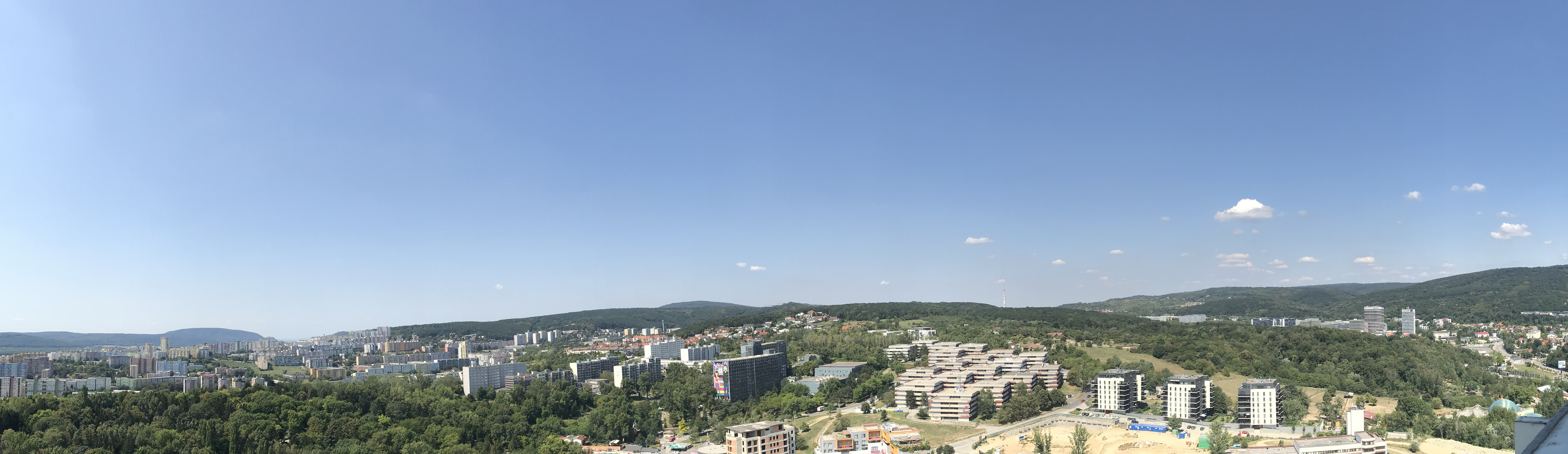
Panorama of Karlova Ves borough seen from the top floor of the tower.

== See also ==
- List of tallest buildings in Slovakia
- List of tallest buildings in Bratislava

Records
Preceded by Incheba Building	Tallest building in Slovakia; 1974–2002	Succeeded by National Bank of Slovakia Tower
