= Klingerka Residential Tower =

Skyscraper in Bratislava

Klingerka
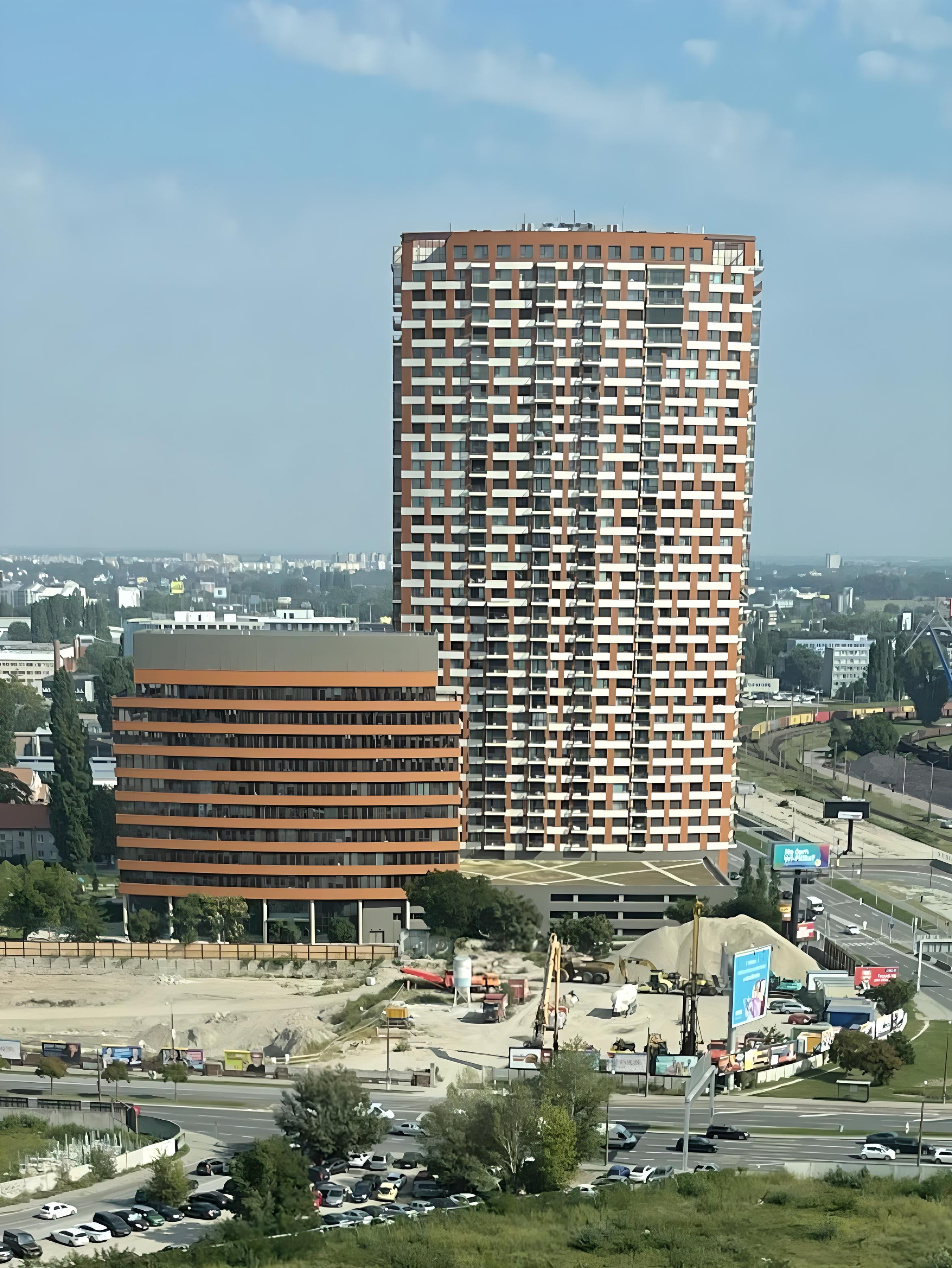
- Interactive map of the Klingerka area

General information
- Status: Completed
- Type: Residential
- Location: Ružinov, Bratislava, Slovakia, Plátennícka 2, 821 09, Ružinov, Bratislava
- Coordinates: 48.14297°N 17.13277°E
- Construction started: 2019
- Completed: 2022
- Owner: J&T Real Estate, a.s. Wayden, s.r.o. (current)

Height
- Roof: 116 m (381 ft)

Technical details
- Structural system: Concrete
- Floor count: 35
- Floor area: 39,000 m^{2} (420,000 sq ft)
- Lifts/elevators: 5

Design and construction
- Architect: GFI Architektúra + Dizajn
- Developer: J&T Real Estate, a.s.
- Main contractor: STRABAG AG

Website
- Klingerka

The Klingerka Residential Tower, or simply known as Klingerka, is a residential skyscraper in Bratislava, Slovakia. The tower stands at 116 m (381 ft) tall and was built between 2019 and 2022. It is the third tallest building in Slovakia and the second tallest residential building, surpassed by the Eurovea Tower. The tower contains 380 apartments.

== History ==
=== Architecture ===
The tower is part of a residential complex built on a former industrial site, hosting two main buildings containing a total of 400 apartments and approximately 10,000 m^{2} of high-standard administrative space, awarded with the BREEAM Excellent Building Certification in 2022. The building was structurally topped out in November 2020 and completed the approval process by September 2021.

The project was initially known as Klingerka II and III. It was first presented in 2008 by companies Koruna Invest, Tatra Hotel and Internationale, with the main aim being the implementation of a 160-metre high skyscraper. J&T Real Estate, a.s. bought the land of the future project and presented the first visualisations of the solution in 2020. The project was initially prepared to host a total of 656 apartments within the main building and five low-rise multifucntional buildings surrounding it. The project includes a multifunctional park the size of half a football pitch. This will became an attractive oasis and social feature, and serve as a natural connection between the original Klinger area and the residential tower located alongside the main road.

== Criticism ==
The complex received the BRUTUS 2022 award for the worst architectural achievement:

When the highest is not the best, and certainly not the most beautiful, or – how low can one fall? Klingerka is a caricature of a futuristic (Slovak) vision of the future, and sadly also a grim reflection of the domestic struggle for the quality of construction, housing, and work. Its material nature, mass form, and placement in the city's image and context do not create space for positive criticism.

== See also ==
- List of tallest buildings in Slovakia
- List of tallest buildings in Bratislava
