= Panorama City Towers =

Skyscraper in Bratislava

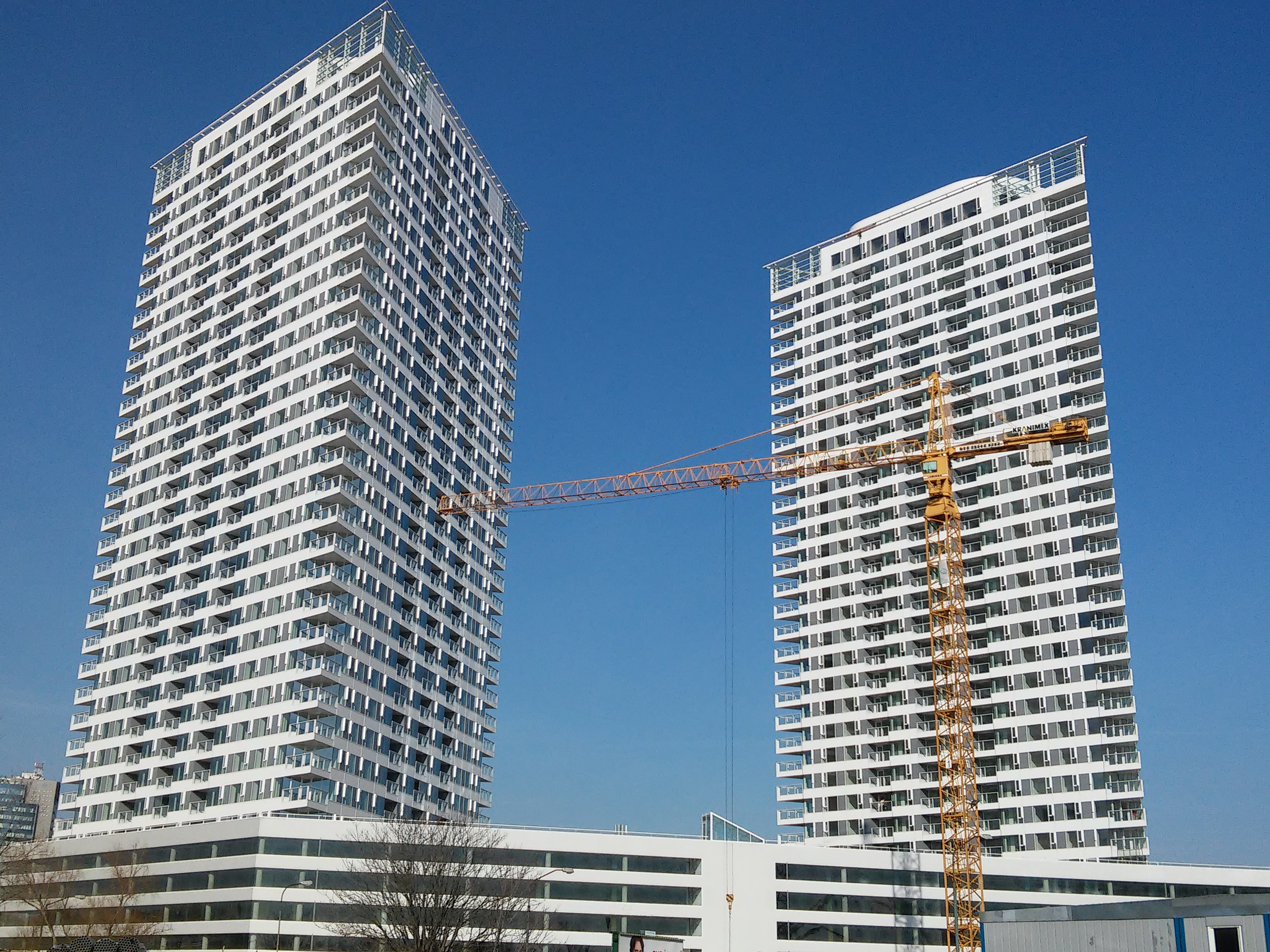
- Interactive map of the Panorama City Towers area

General information
- Status: Completed
- Type: Residential
- Location: Old Town, Bratislava, Slovakia, Landererova 6068, Čulenova, Bratislava
- Coordinates: 48.14216°N 17.12600°E
- Construction started: 2013
- Completed: 2015

Height
- Roof: 112.6 m (369 ft); 112.2 m (368 ft)

Technical details
- Structural system: Concrete
- Floor count: 34 (+1 underground) (both)
- Floor area: 57,000 m^{2} (614,000 sq ft)

Design and construction
- Architects: Ricardo Bofill Taller de Arquitectura; P - T, spol. s r. o.
- Developer: J&T Real Estate, a.s.

Website
- Panorama City

The Panorama City Towers, also known as the Panorama City and the Panorama Towers, are a residential complex of skyscrapers in Bratislava, Slovakia. The buildings are equally divided into 34 floors, while they slightly differ in height, standing at 112.6 metres (369 ft) tall (Tower 1) and 112.2 metres (368 ft) tall (Tower 2), both being topped out in 2015 and inaugurated in 2016. Tower I is the third tallest residential building in Slovakia after the Klingerka. Both of the buildings were the tallest in the country between 2015 and 2020. Panorama City Towers are part of the Eurovea City complex.

== History ==
=== Architecture ===
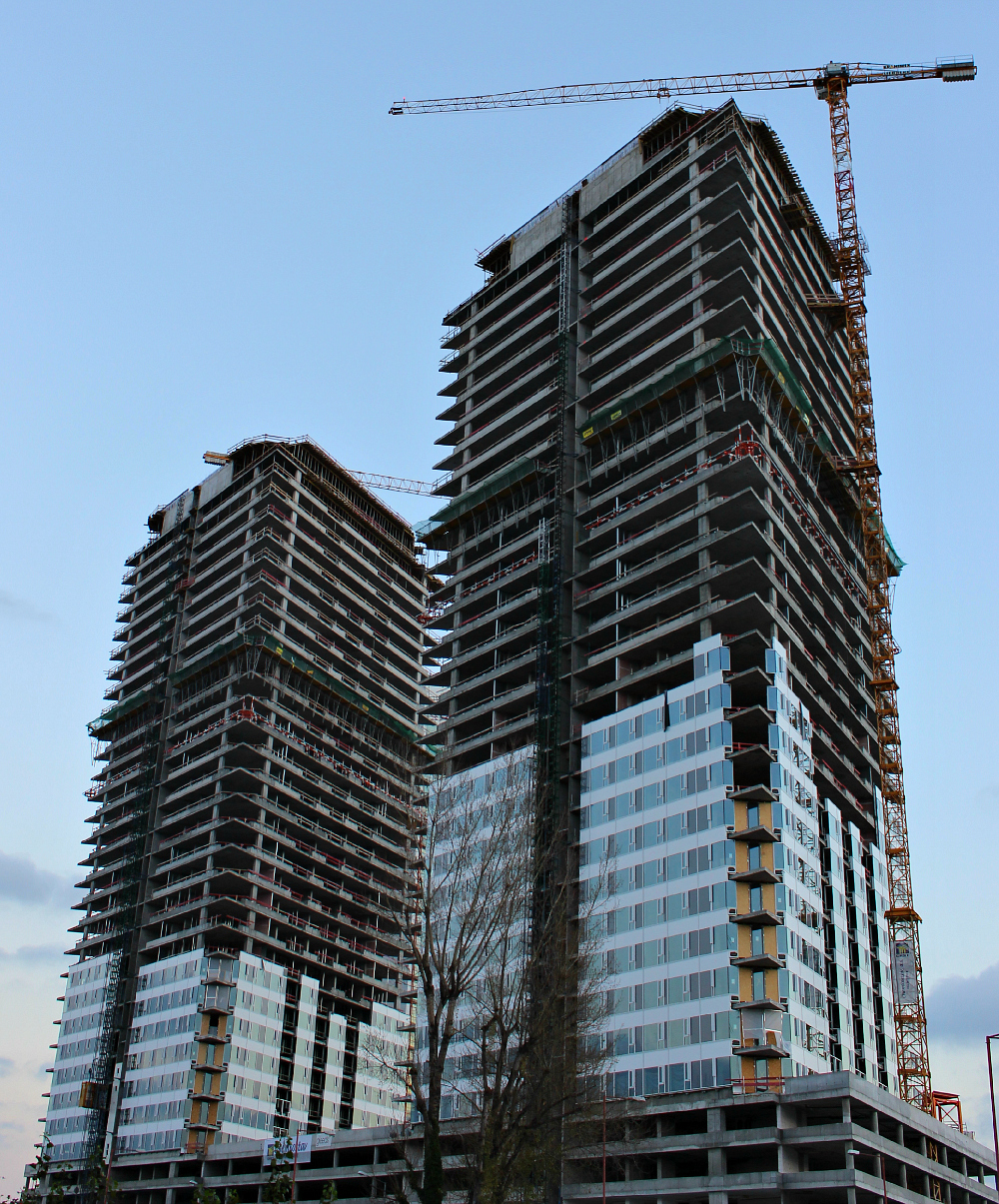
Construction of towers in 2014

Both of the towers have a triangular floor plan and host a total of 606 apartments. The buildings were designed by Spanish architect Ricardo Bofill between 2005 and 2008 and the project itself was processed by P - T, spol. s r. o., under the baton of architect Juraj Hermann. The project was modified several times and the preparatory phase before implementation lasted several years. The construction of the rwo buildings began in July 2013 and the inauguration took place in 2016. The developer is J&T REAL ESTATE, AS (JTRE) related to J&T. The aim of the complex was to combine and concentrate various functions such as administration, trade, services, hotel and housing.

33 of the 34 floors of each building are habitable, with the top floor being reserved for the cooling systems and technical equipment. There are a total of 932 parking spaces in one underground floor and four above-ground garage floors. In addition to the entrance areas to the residential towers, the ground floor is reserved for shops and services for the complex residents.

== See also ==
- List of tallest buildings in Slovakia
- List of tallest buildings in Bratislava

Records
Preceded by National Bank of Slovakia Tower	Tallest building in Slovakia; 2015–2020	Succeeded by Nivy Tower
