= Millennium Tower II (Bratislava) =

Skyscraper in Bratislava

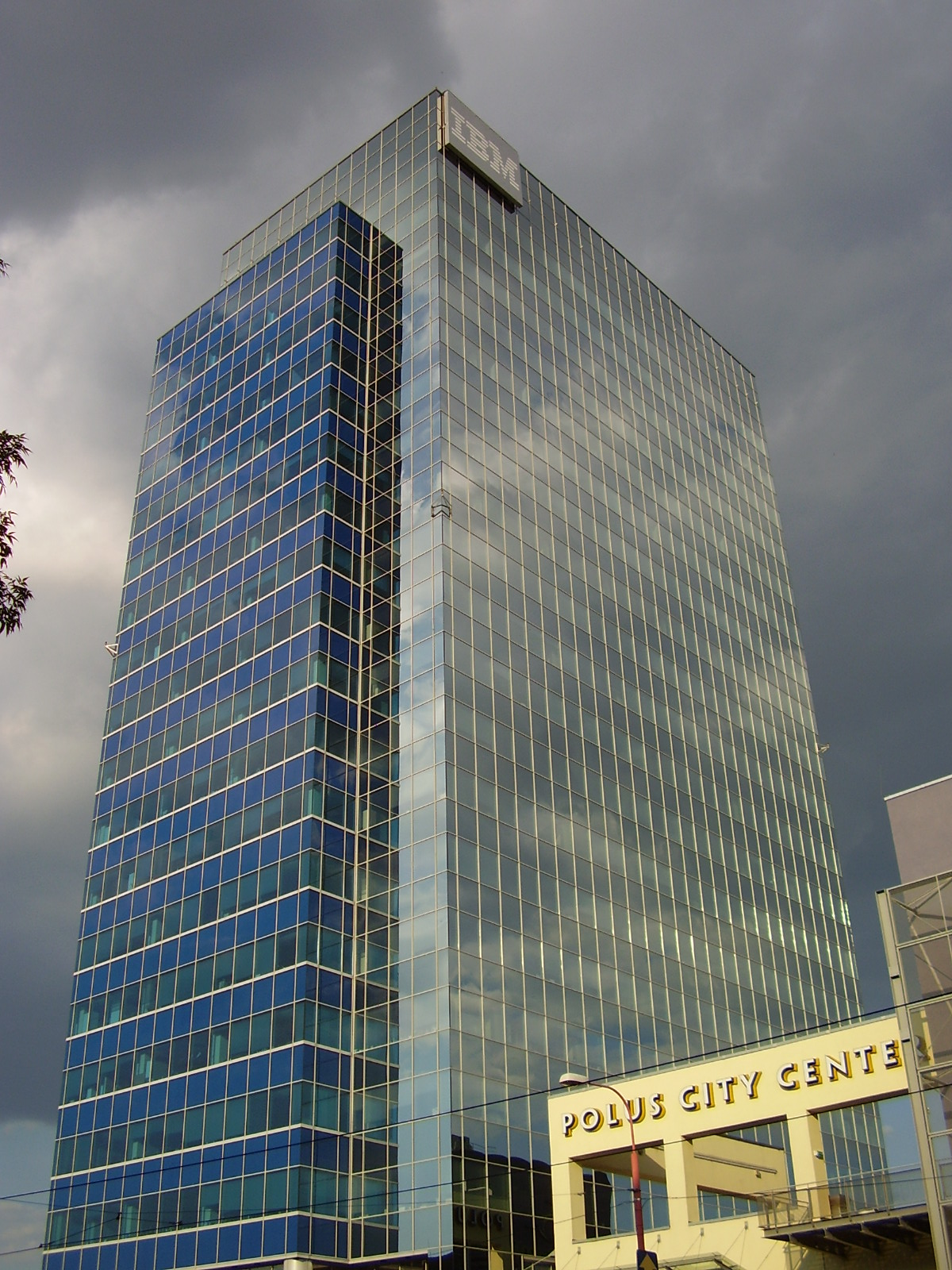

General information
- Status: Completed
- Type: Office
- Location: Nové Mesto, Bratislava, Slovakia, Vajnorská 100/B, 831 04 Bratislava
- Coordinates: 48.169886°N 17.140195°E
- Construction started: 2002
- Completed: 2003
- Cost: $16,000,000 (€14,300,000)

Height
- Roof: 100 m (330 ft)

Technical details
- Structural system: Concrete
- Floor count: 23
- Floor area: 22,600 m^{2} (243,000 sq ft)

The Millennium Tower II (formerly known as Polus Tower II) is a high-rise office building in Bratislava, Slovakia. Standing at 100 m (330 ft) tall with a total of 23 floors, the building was inaugurated in 2003 and is part of the Polus City Center complex known as VIVO! Bratislava as of today.

== History ==
=== Architecture ===
The building is located in the Polus City Center complex and its total height is 85m above ground level. It has 21 above-ground floors with administration and one underground floor serving parking for up to 300 vehicles. The administrative building is constructed as a functionally independent object. It is intended for rent of 22,600 m^{2} of modern and high-quality office space. The main supporting system of the building is formed by a reinforced concrete core located approximately in the center of the building. Five high-speed elevators with a load capacity of 1,800 kg, stairs and sanitary facilities of the building are located inside the core.

Flexible interiors were introduced in both buildings to meet the demands of clients MillTower 1-2 Bratislava.

Since the subsoil of the building consists of sandy clays, and clay gravels and the groundwater level is approximately -6.0 m below ground level, the structure is assembled on a symmetrically loaded base plate of 2.1 m thickness lying directly on the subsoil and a base plate of 0.6 m thickness lying on a compressible base that behaves like a bracket. The increase in the bearing capacity of the subsoil was ensured by the implementation of gravel piles.

== Gallery ==
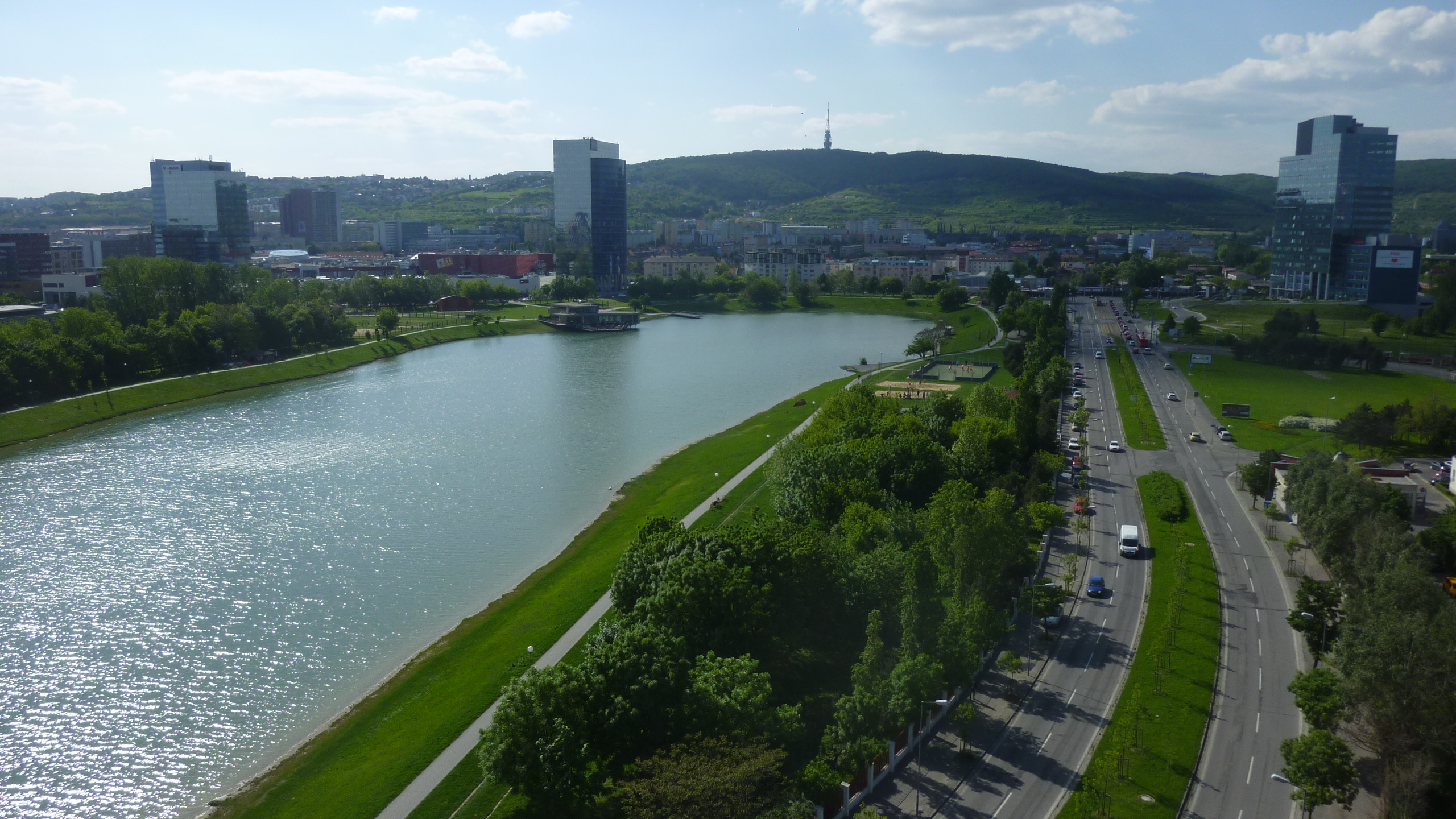
View of Millennium Tower I, Millennium Tower II and Lakeside Park

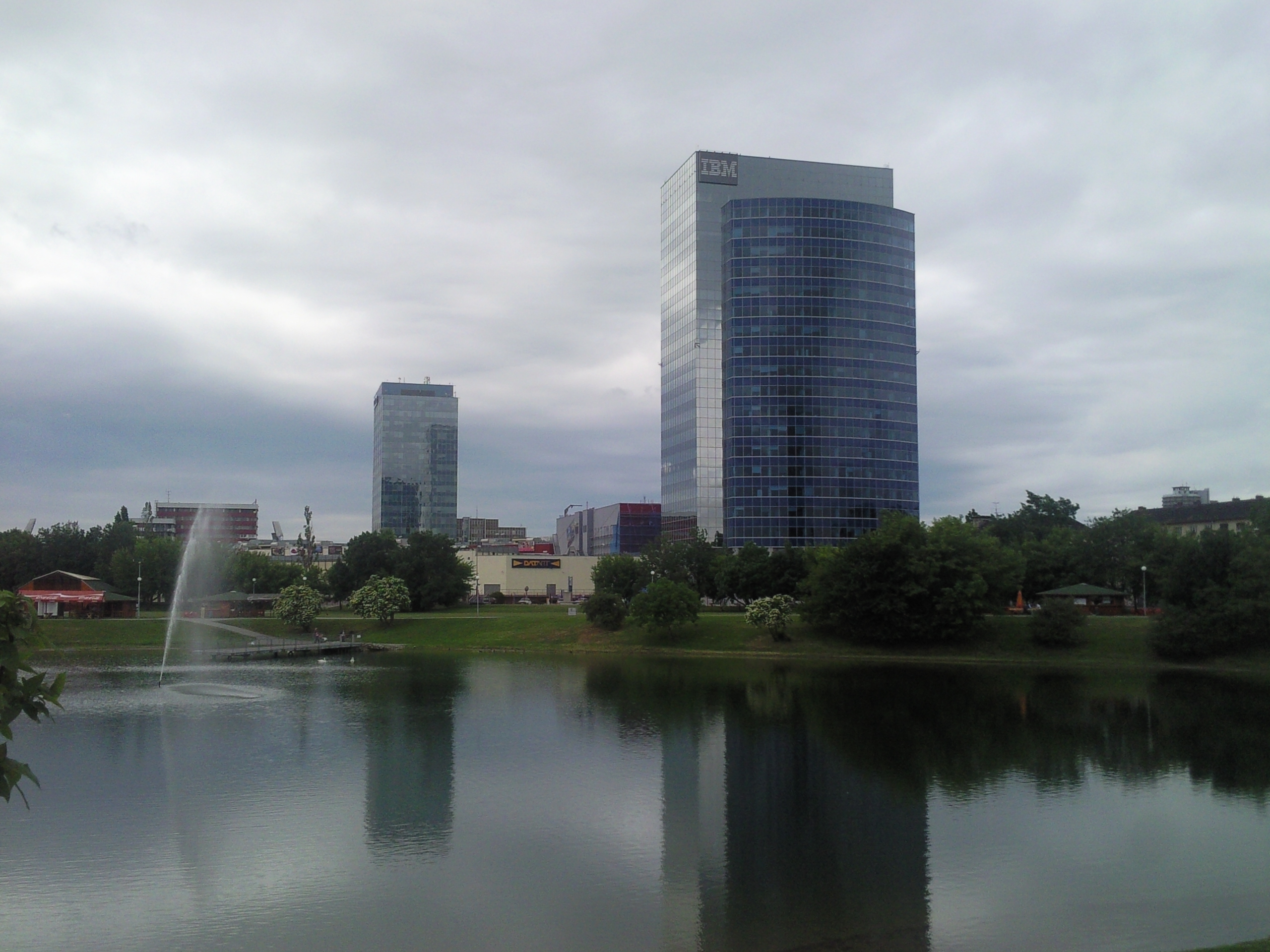
View of Millennium Tower I and Millennium Tower II

== See also ==
- List of tallest buildings in Slovakia
- List of tallest buildings in Bratislava
