= Incheba =

Convention center in Bratislava, Slovakia

Incheba Main Building
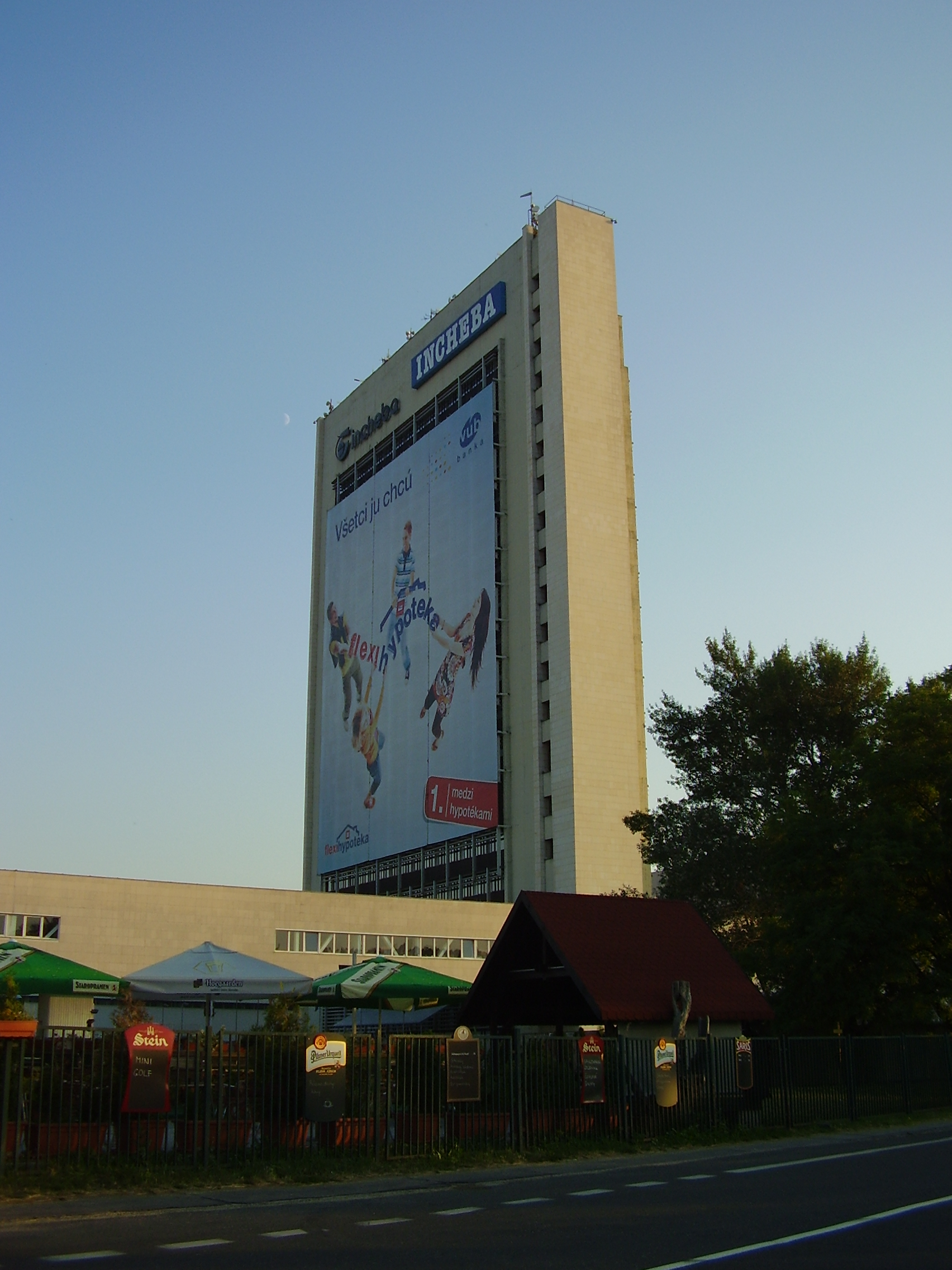
- Incheba Main Building
- Interactive map of the Incheba Main Building area

General information
- Status: Completed
- Location: Petržalka, Bratislava, Slovakia, Viedenská cesta 5, Bratislava 85101
- Coordinates: 48.13384°N 17.09879°E
- Completed: 1967

Height
- Roof: 85.6 m (281 ft)

Technical details
- Structural system: Concrete
- Floor count: 19

Design and construction
- Architect: Vladimír Dedeček

Incheba (Expo) (formerly stylized as Incheba €XPO) (abbreviated from (IN)ternational (CHE)mical (B)ratislav(A)) is a congress and exposition centre located in the Petržalka borough of Bratislava, Slovakia in SNP bridge's proximity. It includes multi-use exhibition halls, a parking lot with 4,500 places, a 19-floor 85.6 metres (281 ft) tall main office building and the Incheba Hotel.

The fair program is oriented to areas such as construction, tourism, gastronomy, chemical industry, automobile industry, cosmetics, fashion, medical equipment and arts. The Coneco, Incheba, Slovmedica and Slovfarma fairs have been included in the UFI calendar. It is also used for events such as concerts, conferences and tournaments. In 2006, more than a million people visited Incheba, of which 700,000 came to a total of 49 expositions, shows and fairs and 338,000 to other events.

== Gallery ==
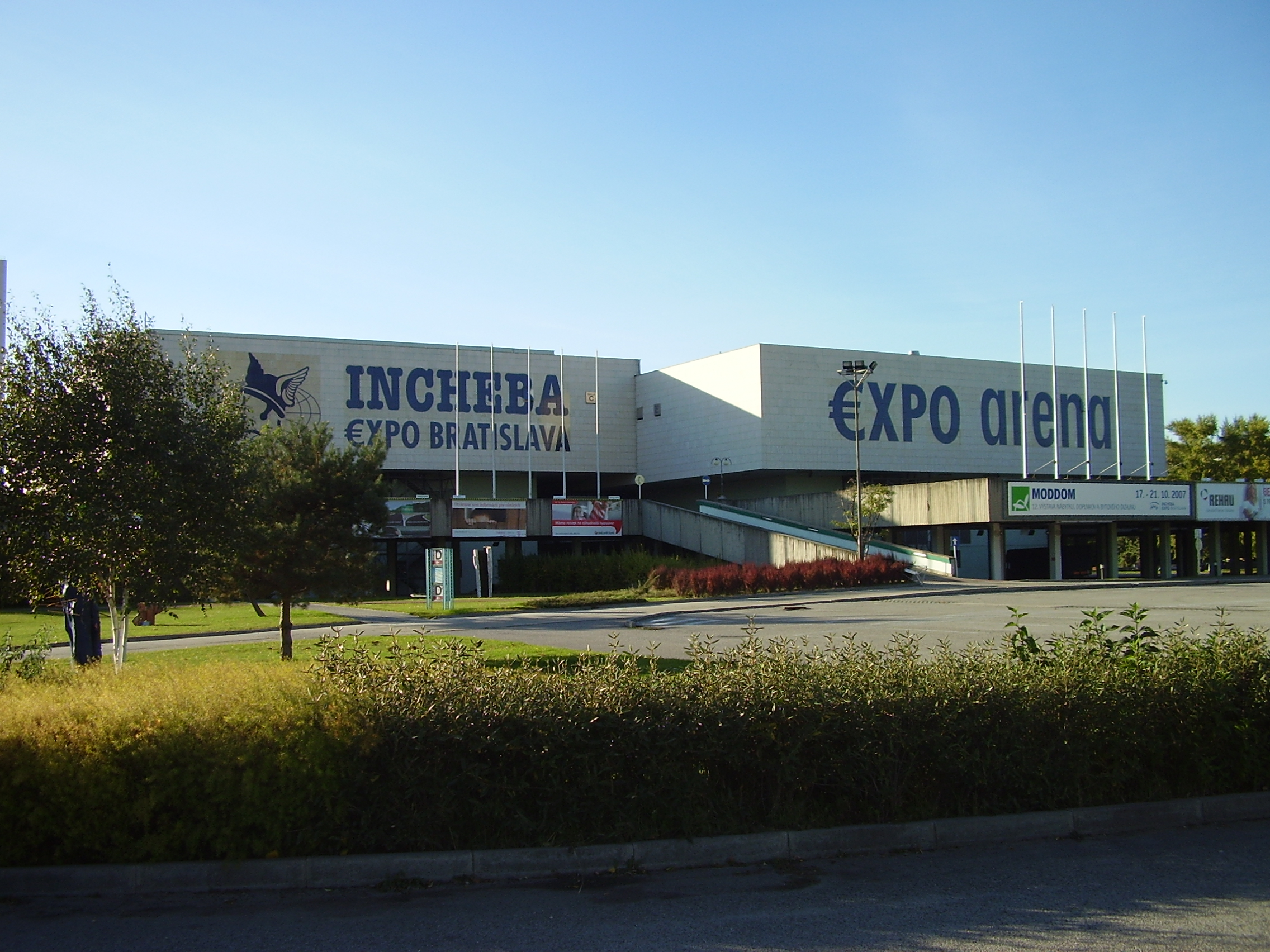
€XPO Arena

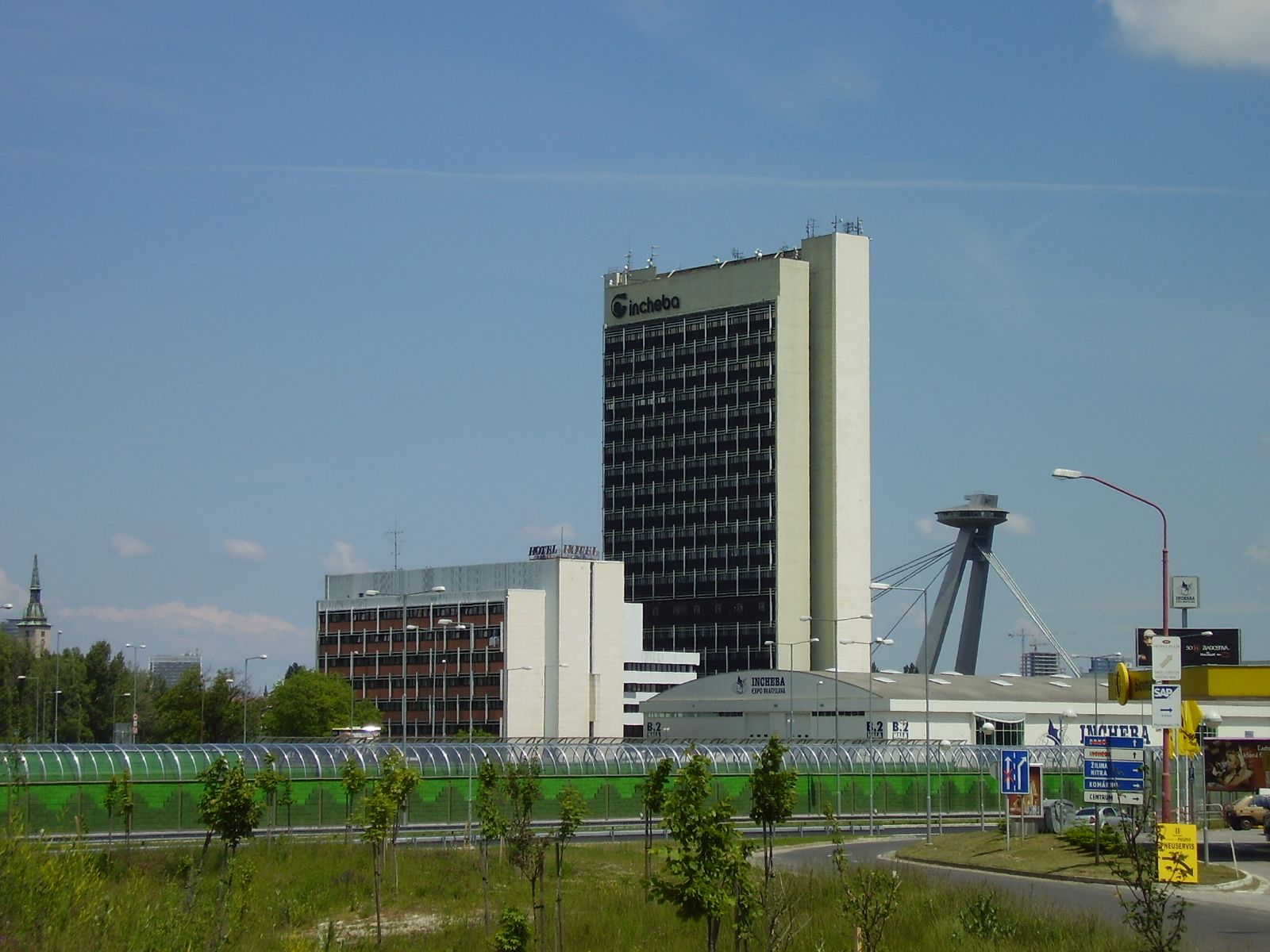
Incheba Expo

== See also ==
- List of tallest buildings in Slovakia
- List of tallest buildings in Bratislava

Records
Preceded by Manderlák	Tallest building in Slovakia; 1967–1974	Succeeded by Slovak Television Building
