= National Bank of Slovakia Tower =

High-rise building in Bratislava

- Budova Národnej banky Slovenska (Slovak)
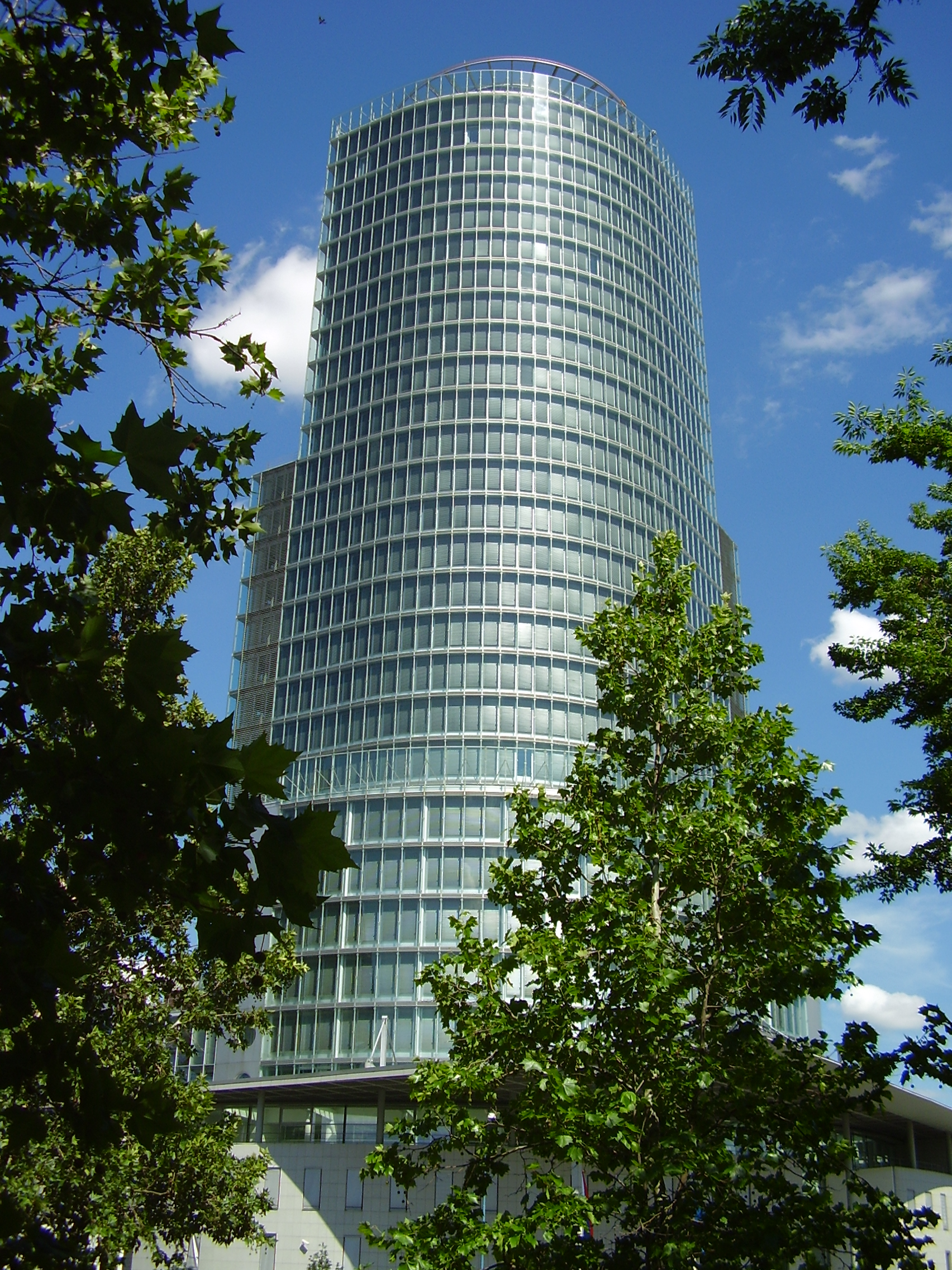
- Interactive map of the National Bank of Slovakia Tower area

General information
- Status: Completed
- Location: Old Town, Bratislava, Slovakia
- Coordinates: 48.1532°N 17.1149°E
- Completed: 2002

Height
- Roof: 111 m (364 ft)

Technical details
- Structural system: Concrete
- Floor count: 33
- Floor area: 6,000 m^{2} (64,600 sq ft)
- Lifts/elevators: 23

Website
- National Bank of Slovakia

The National Bank of Slovakia Tower or NBS Building is a high-rise office skyscraper in Bratislava, Slovakia. The NBS building is located in Old Town district. With a height of 111 meters, it ranked fifth in the list of tallest buildings in Slovakia as of 2024.

== History ==
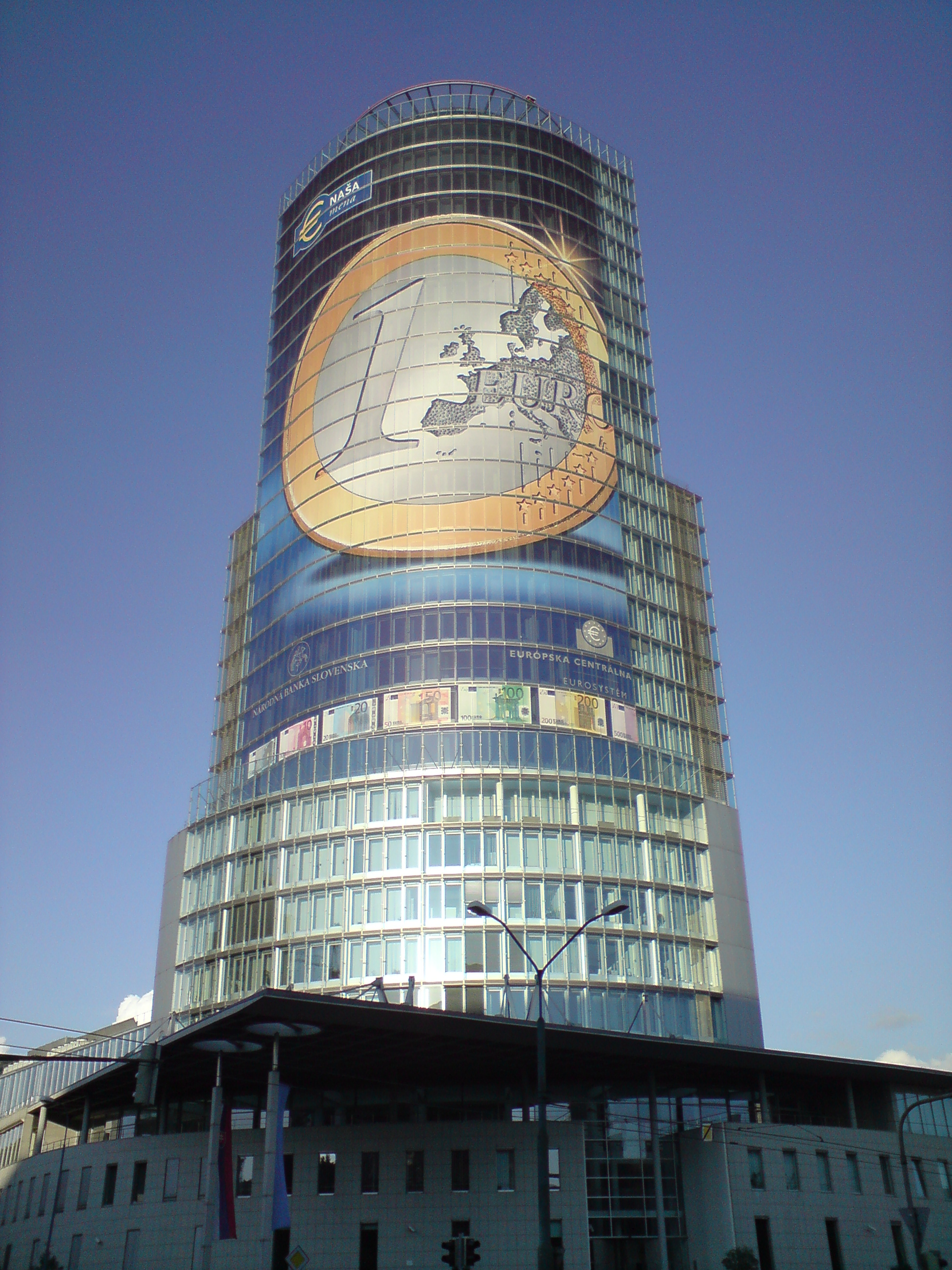
Decoration in September 2008 ahead of Slovakia's adoption of the euro

The building was commissioned by the National Bank of Slovakia for its head office, replacing the former Bratislava branch building of the National Bank of Czechoslovakia erected in the 1930s. The public tender received 24 competitive proposals. A jury of 21 specialists in architecture, construction, and banking assisted NBS in choosing the winner. The project went to Martin Kusý and Pavol Paňák. The design was realised exclusively by Slovak companies.

Construction started in November 1996. It was carried out by the Association H – V – Z (Hydrostav, a.s., Bratislava, Váhostav, a.s., Žilina, ZIPP, s.r.o., Bratislava). Engineering activity was provided by the Association of Engineering (Keramoprojekt, a.s., Trenčín, Keraming, v.o.s., Trenčín, Chempik, a.s., Bratislava).

In 1997, Slovakia's populist prime minister Vladimír Mečiar criticized the new building project as spendthrift, as part of a broader campaign against the National Bank's independence.

After several years of construction delays, the tower opened on 23 May 2002. It was Slovakia's tallest building at the time of completion.

== Architecture ==
The National Bank of Slovakia was established as a new institution following the dissolution of Czechoslovakia in late 1992, and unlike many national central banks in Europe, it did not have much of a past institutional history to refer to. The tower's design architect Pavol Paňák explained: "Because this is a new, dynamic, developing republic, this building should reflect that lack of historical context".

The lower horizontal part of the building houses the operational facilities of the Bank. The building also includes a congress hall and exhibition premises. This part of the building is built around a central yard with a raised green area. The tower itself contains administrative offices.

== Statistics ==
- Height: 111 m
- Floors: 33
- Underground floors: 3
- Area: around 6.000 m²
- Number of lifts: 23
- Capacity: 1 005 people
- Number of underground parking places: 305

== See also ==
- National Bank of Slovakia
- List of tallest buildings in Slovakia
- List of tallest buildings in Bratislava

Records
Preceded by Slovak Television Building	Tallest building in Slovakia; 2002–2015	Succeeded by Panorama City Towers
