= Manderlák Building =

High-rise building in Bratislava

Manderlák
- Obchodný a obytný dom Manderla (Slovak)
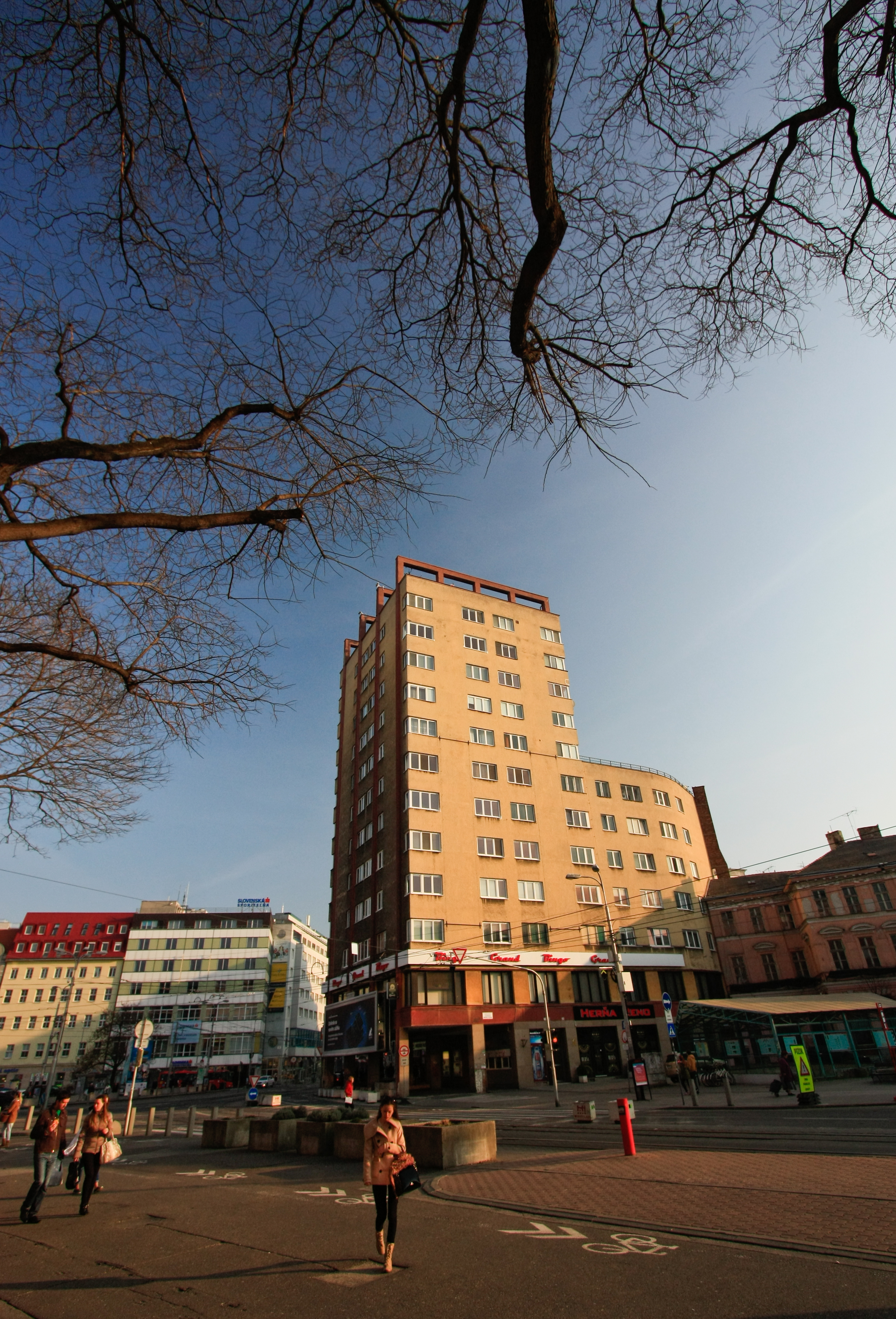
- Interactive map of the Manderlák area

General information
- Status: Completed
- Location: Old Town, Bratislava, Slovakia, Námestie SNP 23, Bratislava
- Coordinates: 48.14458°N 17.11246°E
- Construction started: 1934
- Completed: 1935

Height
- Roof: 45 m (148 ft)

Technical details
- Structural system: Concrete
- Floor count: 11

Design and construction
- Architects: Christian Ludwig, Emerich Spitzer & Augustín Danielis

The Manderlák (Slovak: Obchodný a obytný dom Manderla) is a high-rise residential building in Bratislava, Slovakia. Standing at 45 metres (147 ft) tall with 11 floors and built between 1934 and 1935, the construction was the first-ever high-rise building in Slovakia and the tallest in the country between 1935 and 1967.

== History ==
=== Architecture ===
The building was designed and built by German architects Christian Ludwig, Emerich Spitzer and Augustín Danielis for the Slovak businessman and butcher Rudolf Manderla, who was inspired by the design of slaughterhouses in Chicago. It is the first habitable high-rise building in Slovakia and was named after Manderl himself.

When they started to shape up the concept of the building, the three architects decided they should somwhow remain faithful to the traditional architecture styles, therefore their biggest challenge was to decide at what extent they should use the principles of modern architecture. In the early 1930s, they began proposing several solutions, some of them coming from the traditional Slovak architectural styles, and some of them portraiting modernist architecture of the 1930s. In the first designs from June 1933, the high-rise building was conceived as a compact mass, cantilevered above the pavement and without supporting columns. Ceramic cladding was used on the facade with horizontal windows. The attic was punctuated by V-shaped cutouts.

In another design solution, the cantilever extension was replaced by the support of six columns and the attic with a prominent line of the horizontal railing of the roof terrace. The brick structure and windows grouped in strips enhanced the expressive character of the high-rise building.

In the end, the construction firm of Alexander Feigler and the local branch of the Viennese construction company Pittel+Brausewetter realized the design, which is characterized by restrained purist moderation. They built a tower that had eleven floors, which was above the average height for its time, defiantly standing on four solid pillars.

The ground floor of the house is characterized by a modern archway and a curved passage with entrances to smaller establishments and a butcher shop, which is an integral part of the building today. The architects achieved the airiness and lightness of the ground floor by designing large window openings. On the first floor were offices and the historic Grand Cafe, which was the center of Bratislava's bohemia. There are 64 two and three-room apartments on the upper floors. The equipment of the building was at a very modern technical level for its time.

== Gallery ==
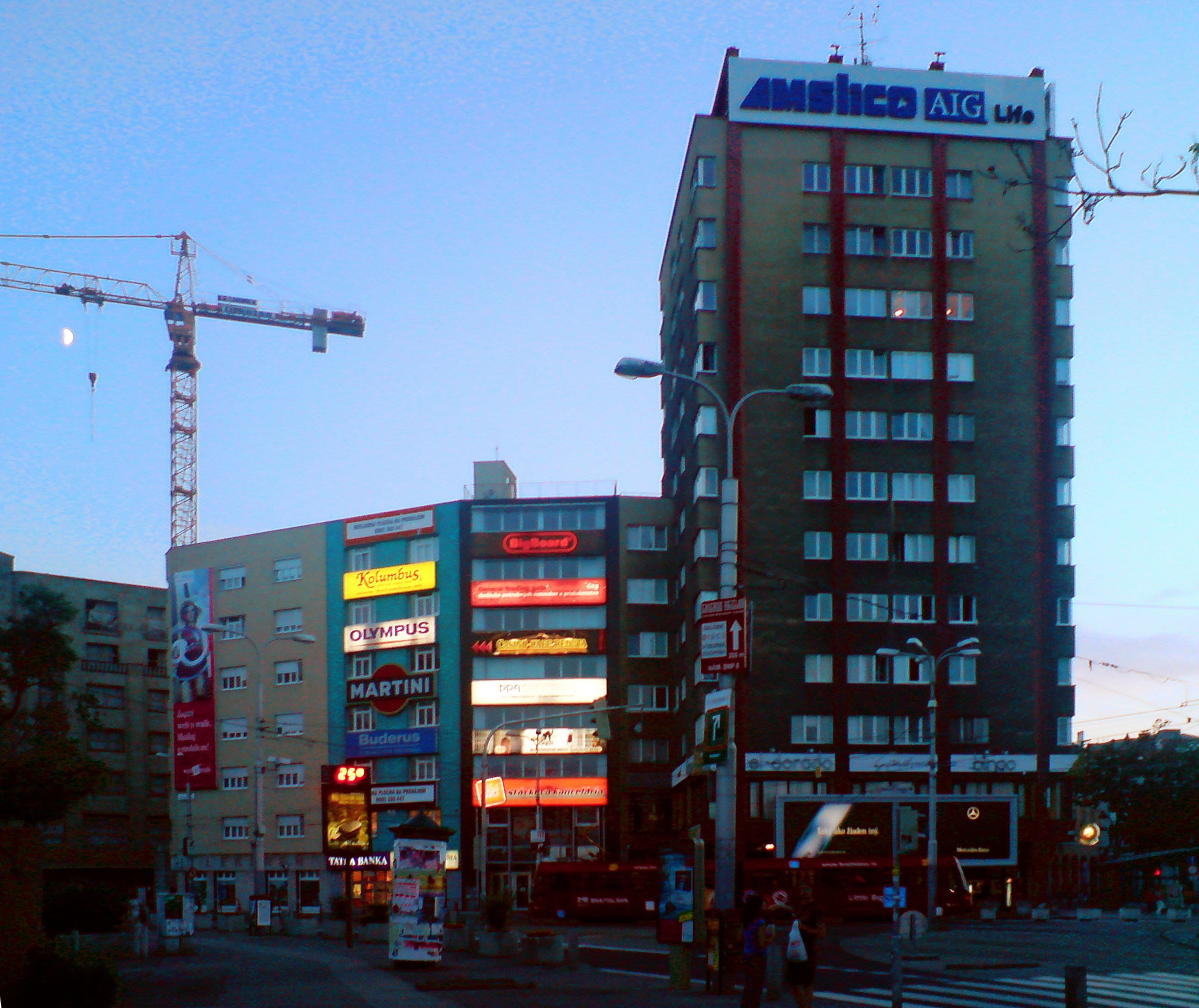
The tower seen from street level

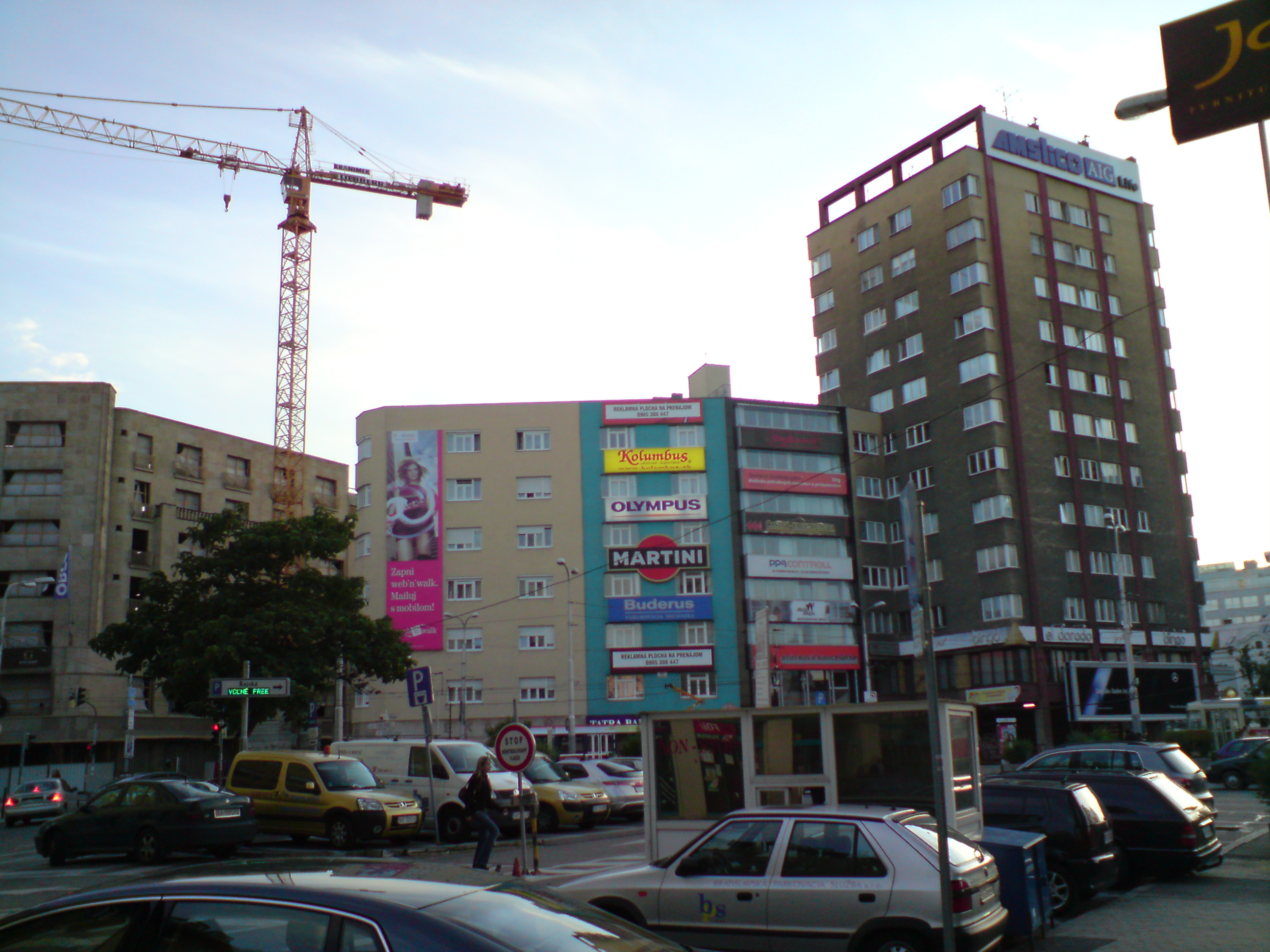
The tower seen from Kamenné námestie

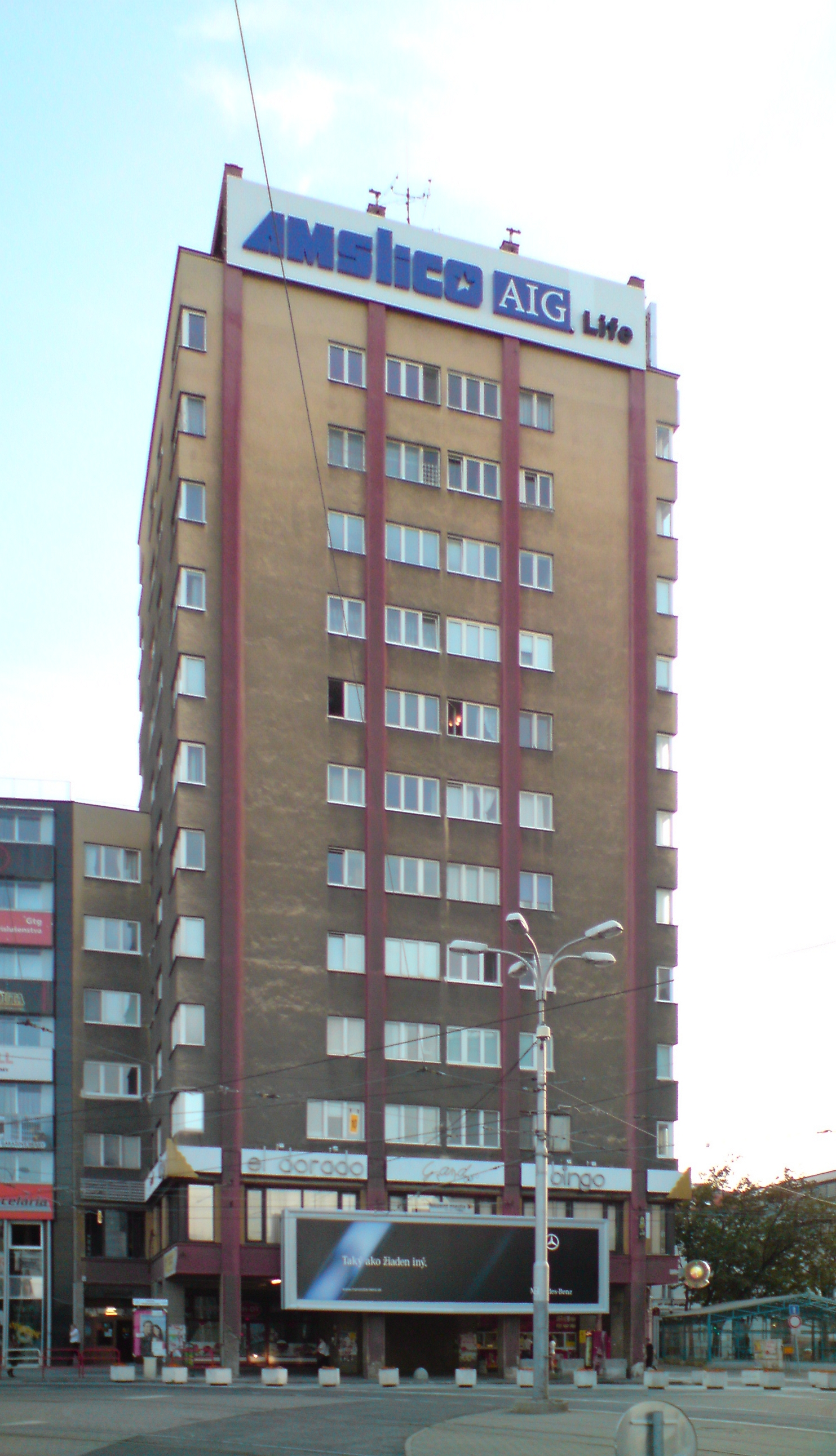
Detail of the building with perspective

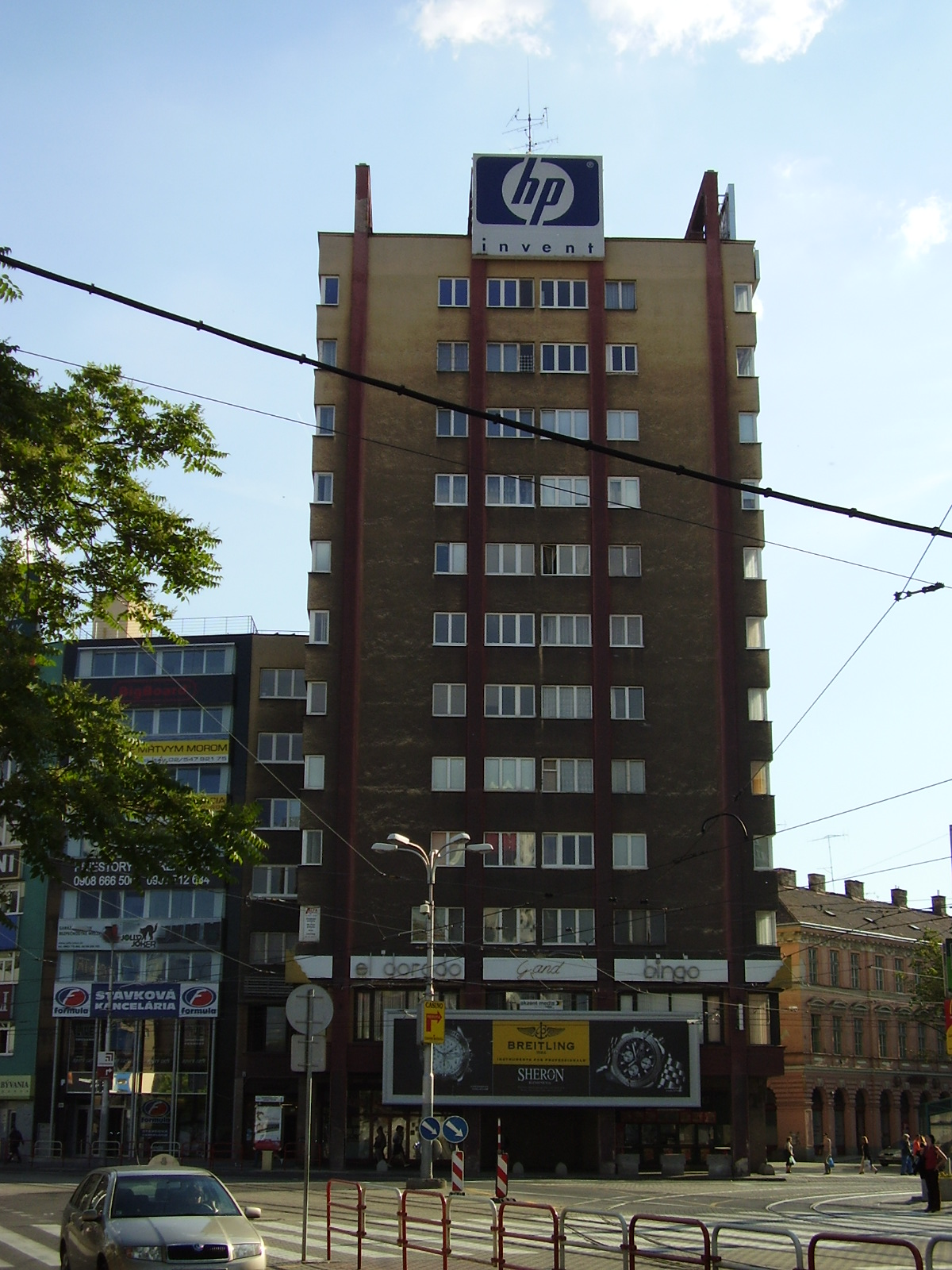
Street level view

== See also ==
- List of tallest buildings in Slovakia
- List of tallest buildings in Bratislava

Records
Preceded by	Tallest building in Slovakia; 1935–1967	Succeeded by Incheba Building
