= Technopol =

Coordinates: 48°6′41.43″N 17°6′39.07″E

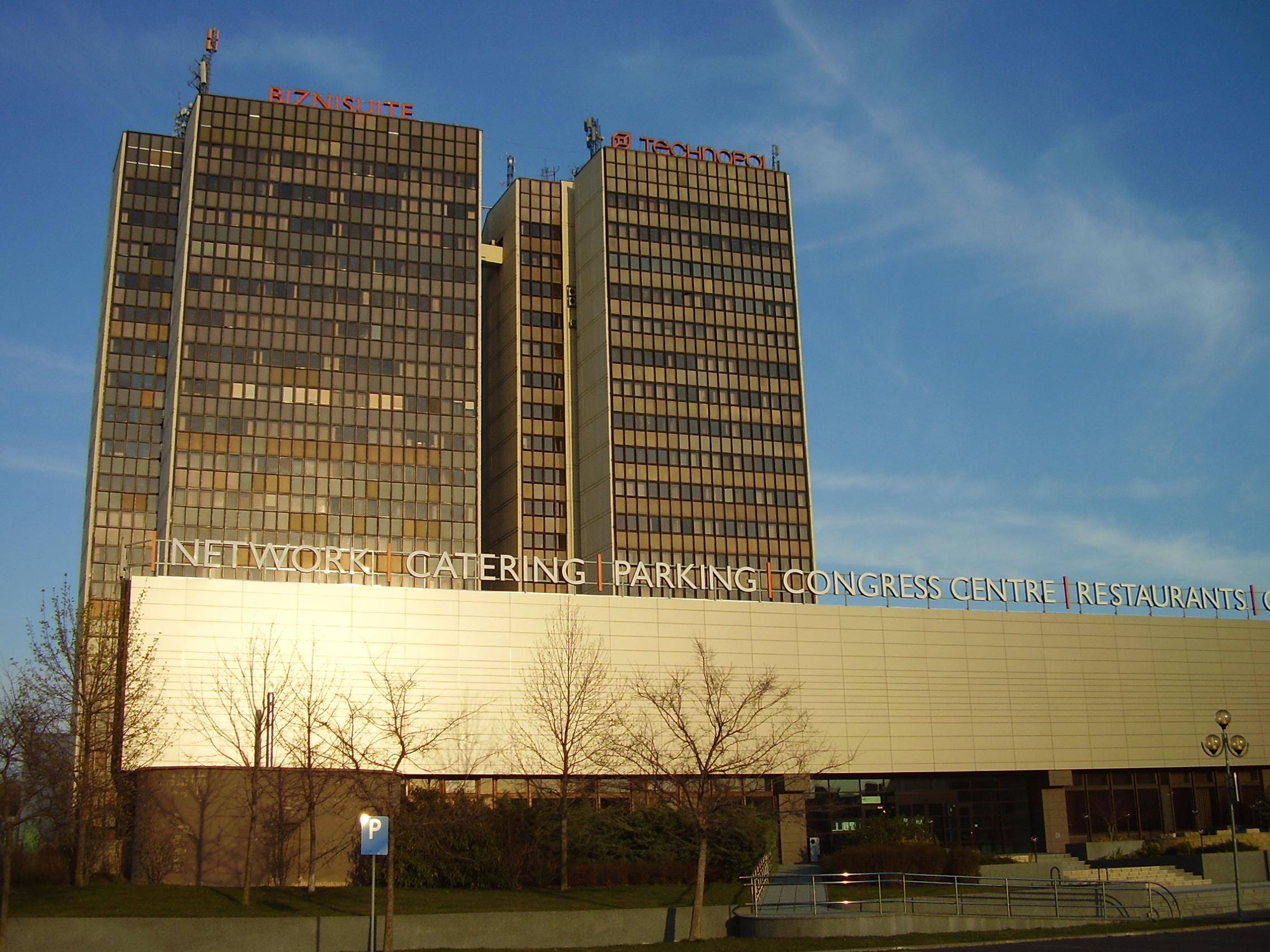
Technopol

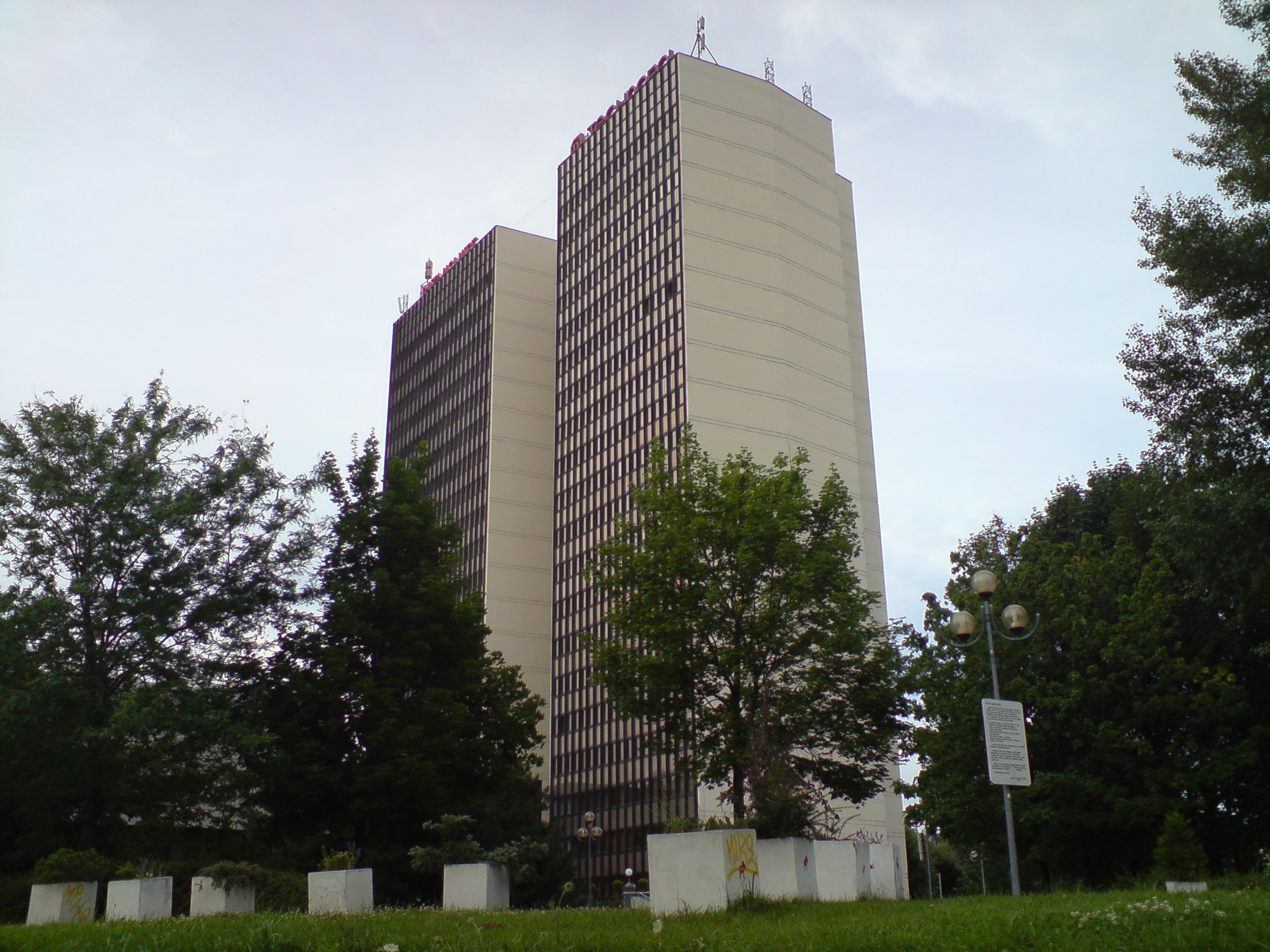
Technopol

Technopol is the second tallest building in Petržalka (one of the Bratislava districts) and one of the tallest buildings in Bratislava.

It consists of two buildings 90 m (300 ft) height and it is located on Kutlíkova street, 17, near Chorvátske rameno in front of John Paul II Square and The Holy Family Church.

Technopol serves as a headquarters of several companies, such as Technopol, a.s. and also Petržalka self-government office.

== Construction ==
The building was constructed in 1984 and serves predominantly for office spaces.

== Vicinity ==
In south front of the building there is a small park and the central square in the middle of which there is a so-called singing fountain. The fountain is in operation in certain days and has special light effects and a music accompaniment.
