= Twin City (Bratislava) =

Twin City, the biggest regeneration project in Central Europe started in Bratislava in 2011. Its goal was to build a multifunctional complex (culture, entertainment, commercial, business, residence, accommodation and transport). Twin City is located at the border of the Old Town and Ružinov districts.

A 22-floor high-rise building is the dominant object of the complex (92 metres in height). The original study assumed 42 floors and 170 metres in height but the change was incorporated after public negotiations.

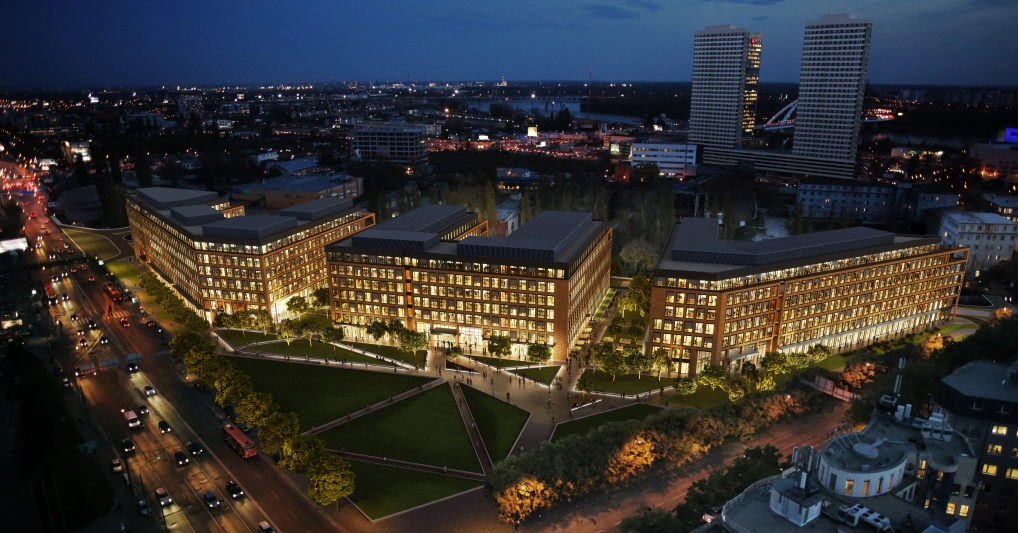
Visualisation of the project, without tower completed in 2019.
