= Economy of Bratislava =

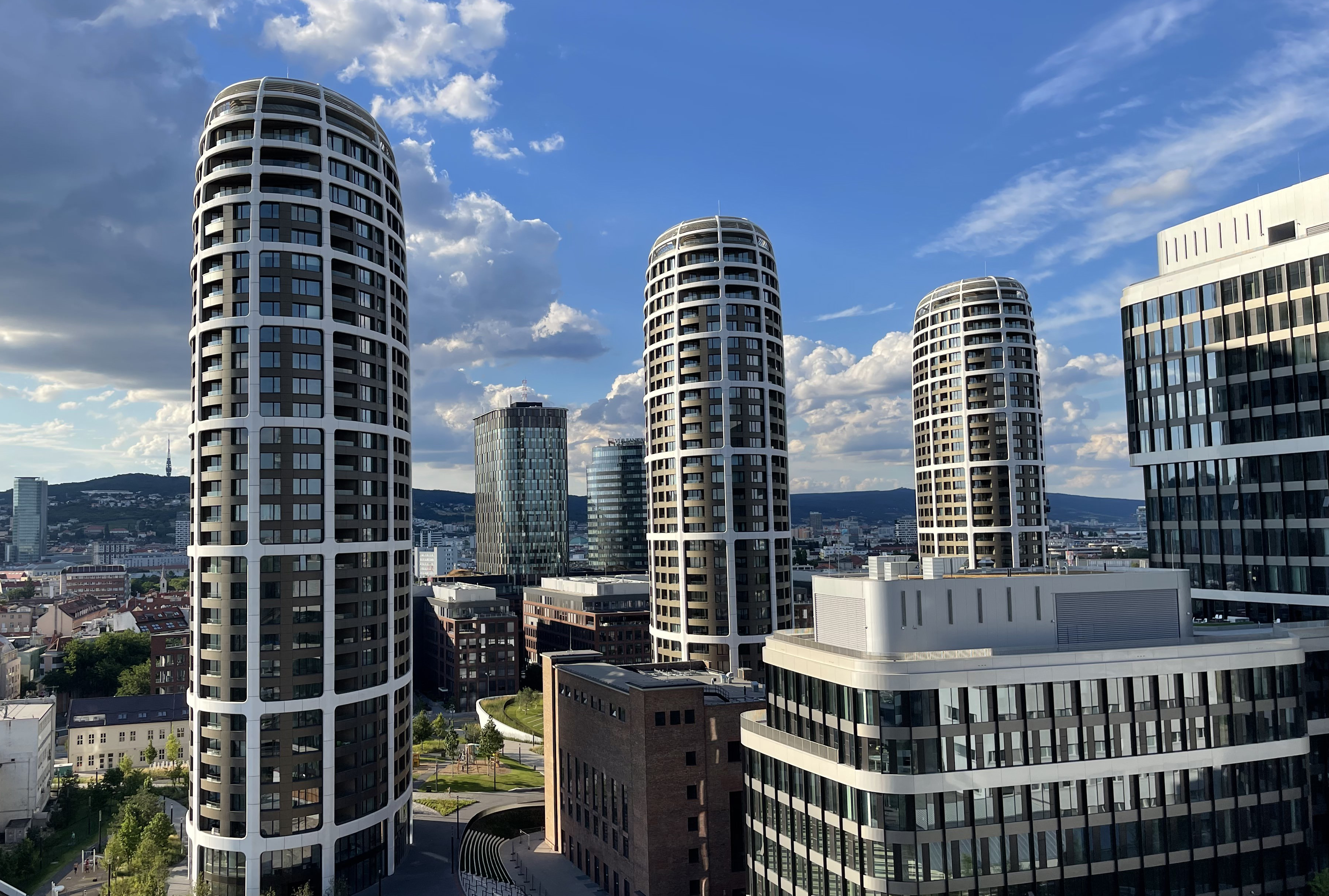
Sky Park high-rise buildings in Bratislava downtown

The Bratislava Region is the wealthiest and economically most important region in Slovakia, despite being the smallest by area and having the second smallest population of the eight Slovak regions. The majority of governmental institutions, including the Ministry of Finance and the central bank, as well as many Slovak private companies and subsidiaries of multinational companies in Slovakia have their headquarters in Bratislava. More than 75% of Bratislava's population works in the service sector, mainly composed of trade, banking, IT, telecommunication industry, tourism and others. Major factories in Bratislava include the Slovnaft oil refinery and the Volkswagen Bratislava plant. The Bratislava Stock Exchange (BSSE), the organiser of the public market of securities, was founded on March 15, 1991.

== Budget ==
Bratislava has a balanced budget of almost six billion Slovak korunas (€182 million) as of 2007. One fifth of that is used for investment. Bratislava holds shares in 17 companies directly, for example in the public transport company (Dopravný podnik Bratislava), the waste collection and disposal company, the water utility and others. The city also manages municipal organisations such as the City Police (Mestská polícia), Bratislava City Museum, ZOO Bratislava, etc.

== GDP ==
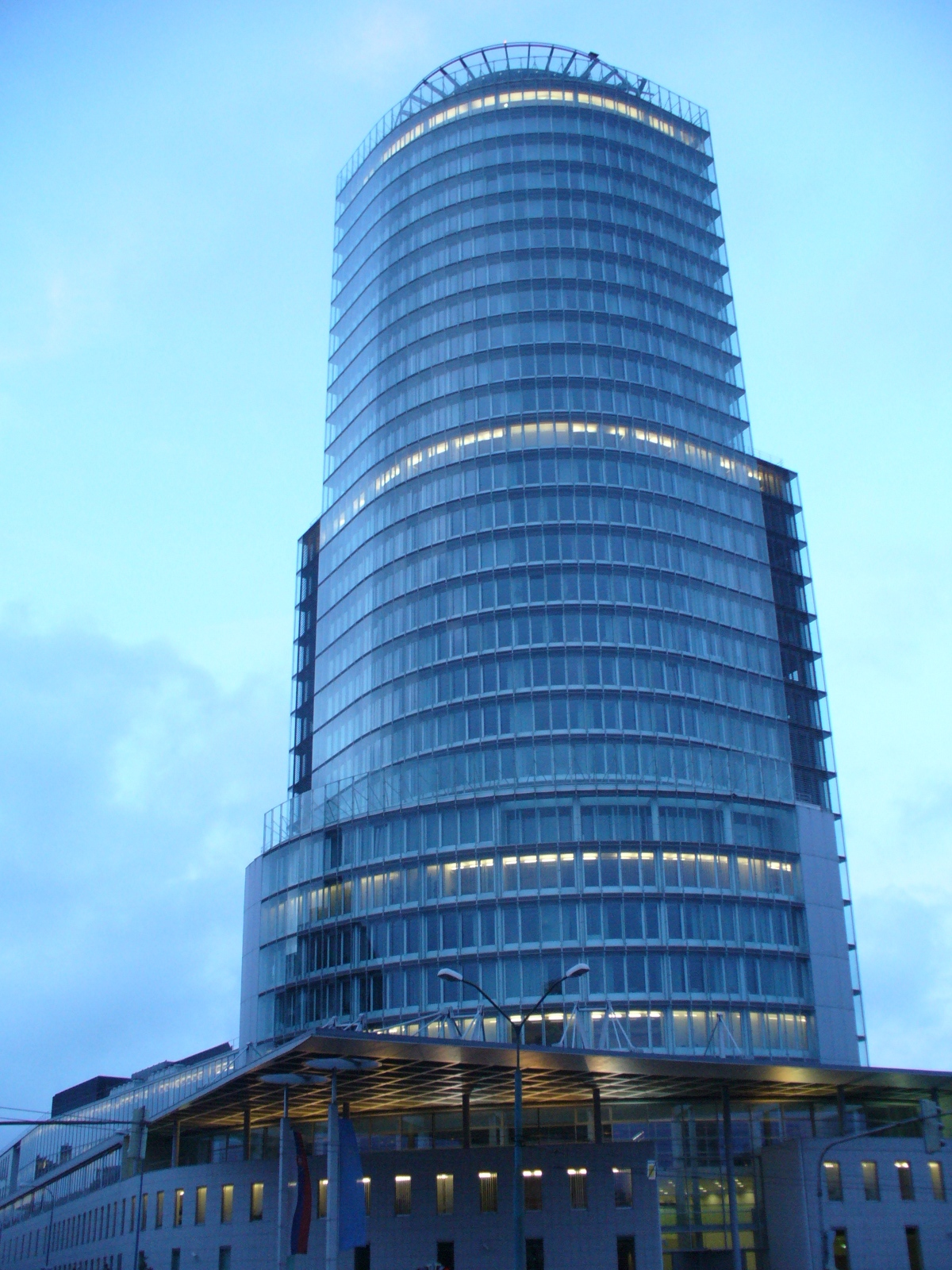
National Bank of Slovakia office tower in Bratislava

The Bratislava Region is the wealthiest and economically most prosperous region of Slovakia, despite being the smallest by area and having the second smallest population of the eight Slovak regions. It accounts for about 26% of the Slovak GDP. The GDP per capita (PPP) is 188% (2016) of the EU average which is the fifth highest of all regions in the EU member states. Statistics are though deformed by centralisation in Slovakia, where almost all governmental institutions as well as private companies in the country have their headquarters in the capital and by lower number of official inhabitants as compared to estimates.

The primary sector is represented only with a share of 0.9% in the region, that is, one fifth of the share observed at the national level (4.5%). The secondary sector accounts for 20.3%, that is 11.5 percentage points under the share in the Slovakia.

== Foreign investments ==
More than 60% of all direct foreign investments in Slovakia are located in the Bratislava Region. A car manufacturer Volkswagen Slovakia was established in Bratislava in 1991 subsequent to acquiring Škoda Auto and has expanded since. Currently, its production focuses on sport utility vehicles, which represent 68% of all production. VW Touareg is finished and Porsche Cayenne and Audi Q7 are partially built there.

In recent years service and high-tech oriented businesses are thriving in Bratislava. Many global companies, including IBM, Dell, Lenovo, AT&T, SAP, and Accenture, are building their outsourcing and service centres or have plans to build in the near future here.

== Overview of biggest companies ==
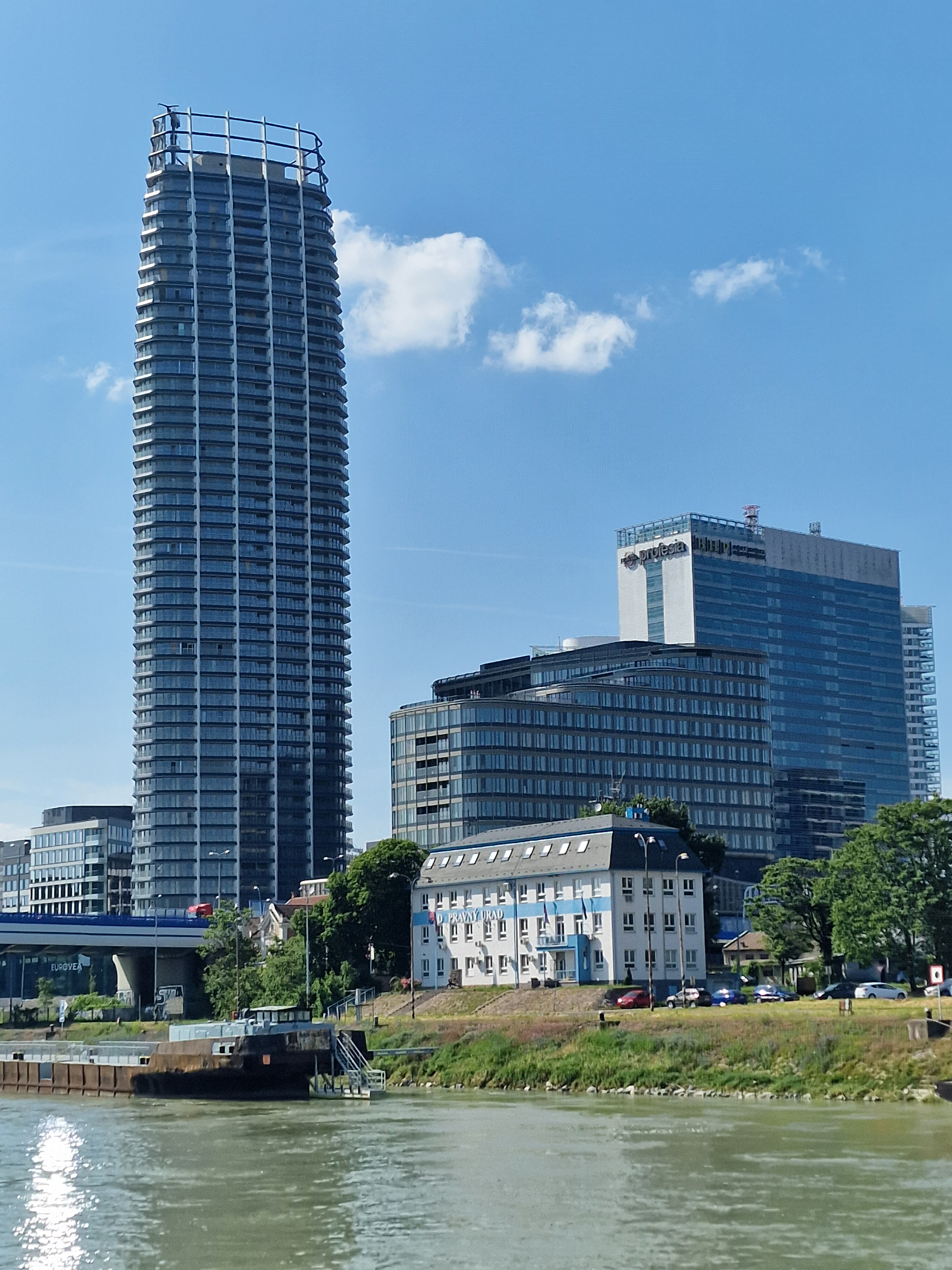
Eurovea Tower

Other important companies and big employers with headquarters in Bratislava include:

- IT companies - BGS Distribution, Asbis SK, Accenture, Hewlett-Packard Slovakia, ESET, AT&T, Lenovo, Dell, IBM, Sygic, Pixel Federation
- Telecommunication companies - Slovak Telekom (owner of T-Mobile Slovensko), Orange Slovensko, Slovanet, O_{2}, GTS Nextra
- Financial institutions - Slovenská sporiteľňa, Všeobecná úverová banka, Tatra banka, UniBanka, Allianz – Slovenská poisťovňa, Kooperativa poisťovňa, Winterthur
- Construction companies - Doprastav, ZIPP Bratislava, Strabag
- Chemical and Pharmaceutical companies - Slovak's largest oil refinery Slovnaft, Henkel Slovensko
- Utility companies - Slovenský plynárenský priemysel (literally Slovak Gas Industry), Slovenské elektrárne (Slovak Electric company), Západoslovenská energetika (Electricity distribution company)
- Food companies - Kraft Foods Slovakia, Palma-Tumys, Rajo
- Engineering companies - Whirlpool Slovakia, Johnson Controls International, SAS Automotive
- Car manufacturers companies - Volkswagen Slovakia, Kia, PSA Group
- Travel companies - Satur Travel
- Transportation companies - Železnice Slovenskej republiky, Cargo Slovakia, Dopravný podnik Bratislava
- Retailing companies - Tesco Stores Slovak Republic
- Real estate development companies - JTRE, Penta Real Estate

== Industry ==
Historically, Bratislava was among the most industrialized and developed cities within the Kingdom of Hungary and most of this heritage was destroyed during the 20th and 21st centuries. Despite Bratislava region being the first region in Slovakia where trade and services have overtaken industrial production there are several major industrial facilities in the city. The main sectors include the chemical, automotive, engineering, electrotechnical and food-processing industries. Major industrial facilities include: Slovnaft oil refinery, Volkswagen Bratislava factory and the Port of Bratislava.

== Construction boom ==
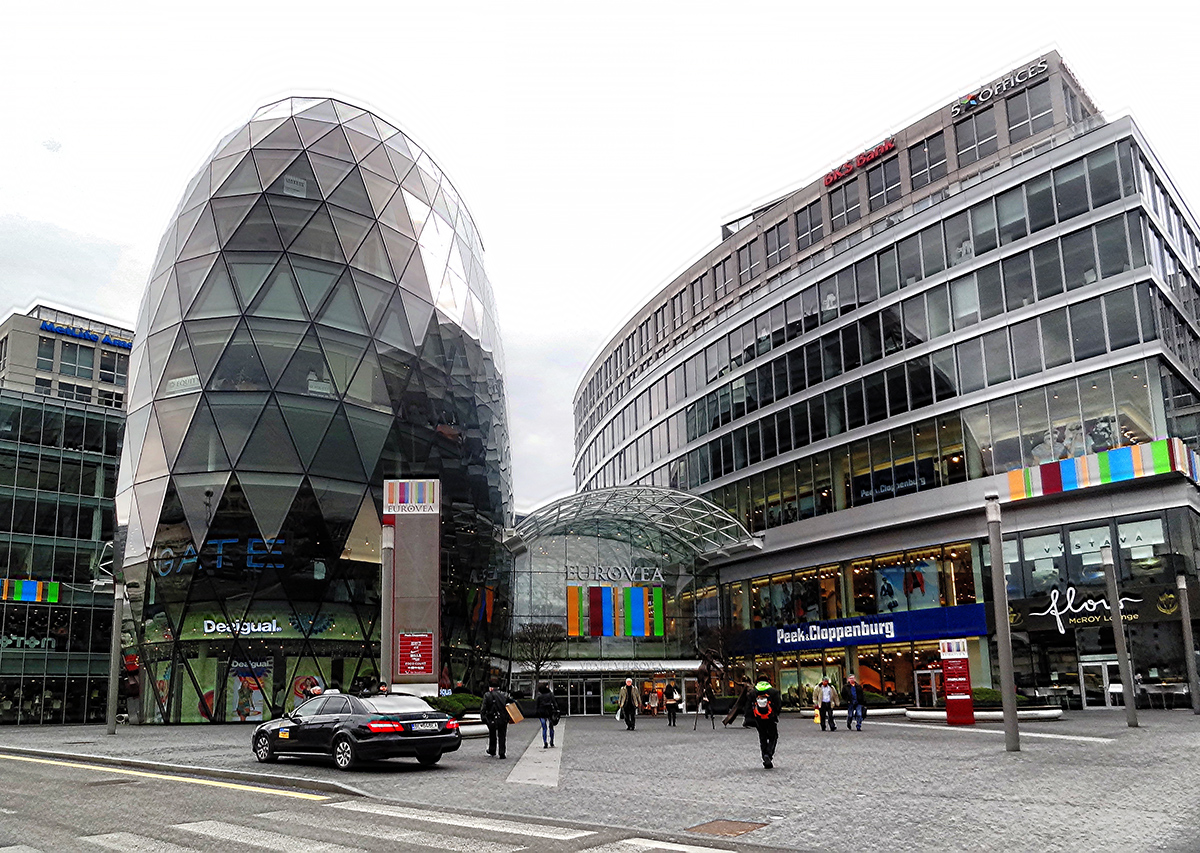
Eurovea

The Slovak economy's strong growth in the 2000s has led to a boom in the construction industry, and several major projects have been completed in or are planned for Bratislava. Areas attracting developers include the Danube riverfront, with two major projects already under construction: River Park in the Old Town, and Eurovea near the Apollo Bridge. Other locations under development include the areas around the main railway and bus stations, around the former industrial zone near the Old Town, and in the boroughs of Petržalka and Ružinov. It is expected that investors will spend €1.2 billion on new projects by 2010. See also List of tallest buildings in Bratislava.

== Education ==
Around 38% of all university educated people in the country are concentrated in Bratislava. The potential of the qualified population with a university or college education is utilised to the level of 94%.
