= Eurovea Galleria =

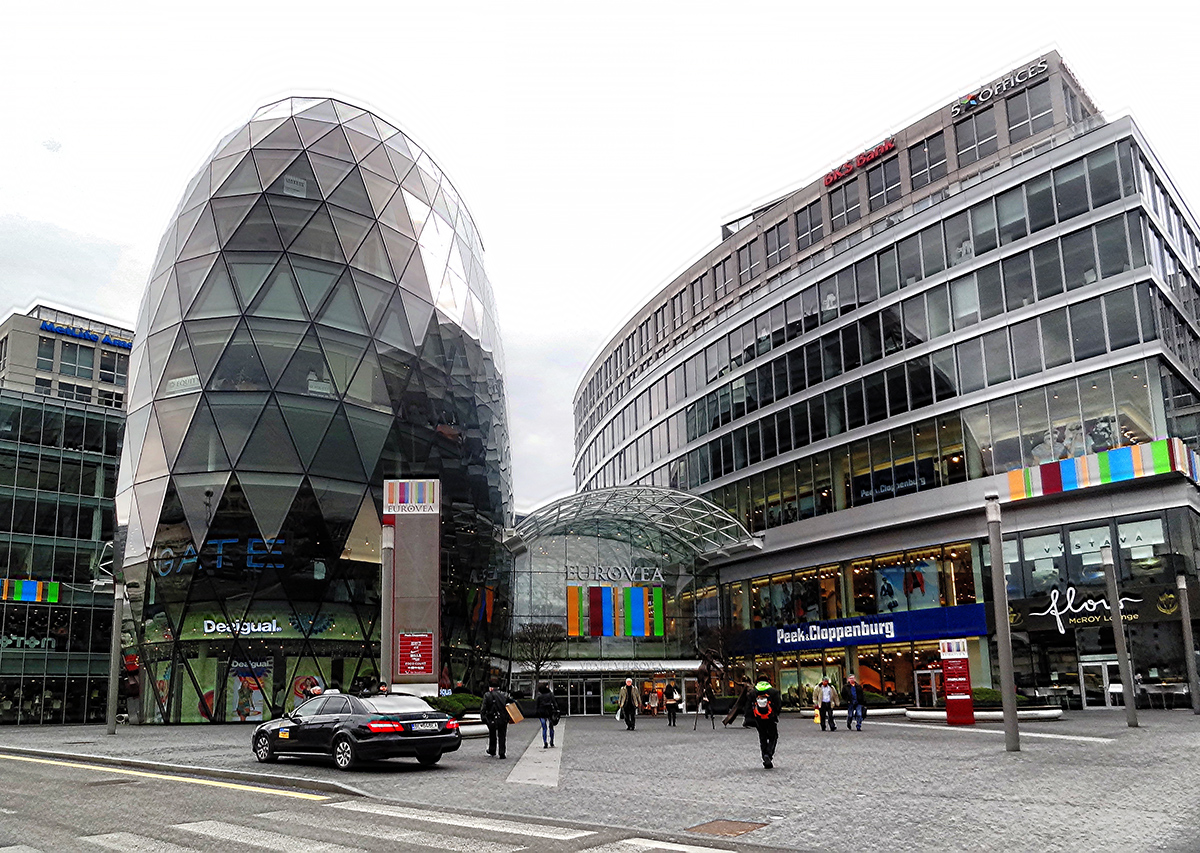
- Main entrance
- Location: Old Town, Bratislava, Slovakia
- Address: Pribinova Street No. 8
- Opened: 26 March 2010
- Developer: J&T Real Estate
- Manager: Cushman & Wakefield
- Owner: Peter Korbačka
- Num. of stores: 320
- Floor area: 85,000 square metres (914,932.4 sq ft)
- Floors: 3
- Parking: Underground garage (1324 spaces)
- Website: www.eurovea.sk/en

The Eurovea Galleria, simply known as the Eurovea is the largest shopping mall in Bratislava and also in Slovakia, which covers an area of 85,000 m^{2} (910,000 sq ft). Eurovea Galleria is part of Eurovea complex, which is part of Eurovea City.

Eurovea Galleria is situated next to Apollo Bridge, in the area next to the Danube river, where the majority of current high-rise buildings and future skyscrapers are located. It is accessible by car or public bus.

It mainly contains stores of international brands. The centre, with an area of 85,000 m^{2} (910,000 sq ft), houses a hypermarket, a cinema complex, 320 stores, restaurants, cafés and other food outlets.

== History ==
Phase I was opened in March 2010, while Phase II was opened in May 2023 and added 26,000 square metres (279,861.7 sq ft) to the existing rental area of 59,000 square metres (635,070.7 sq ft) with more than 150 shops.

== Image gallery ==
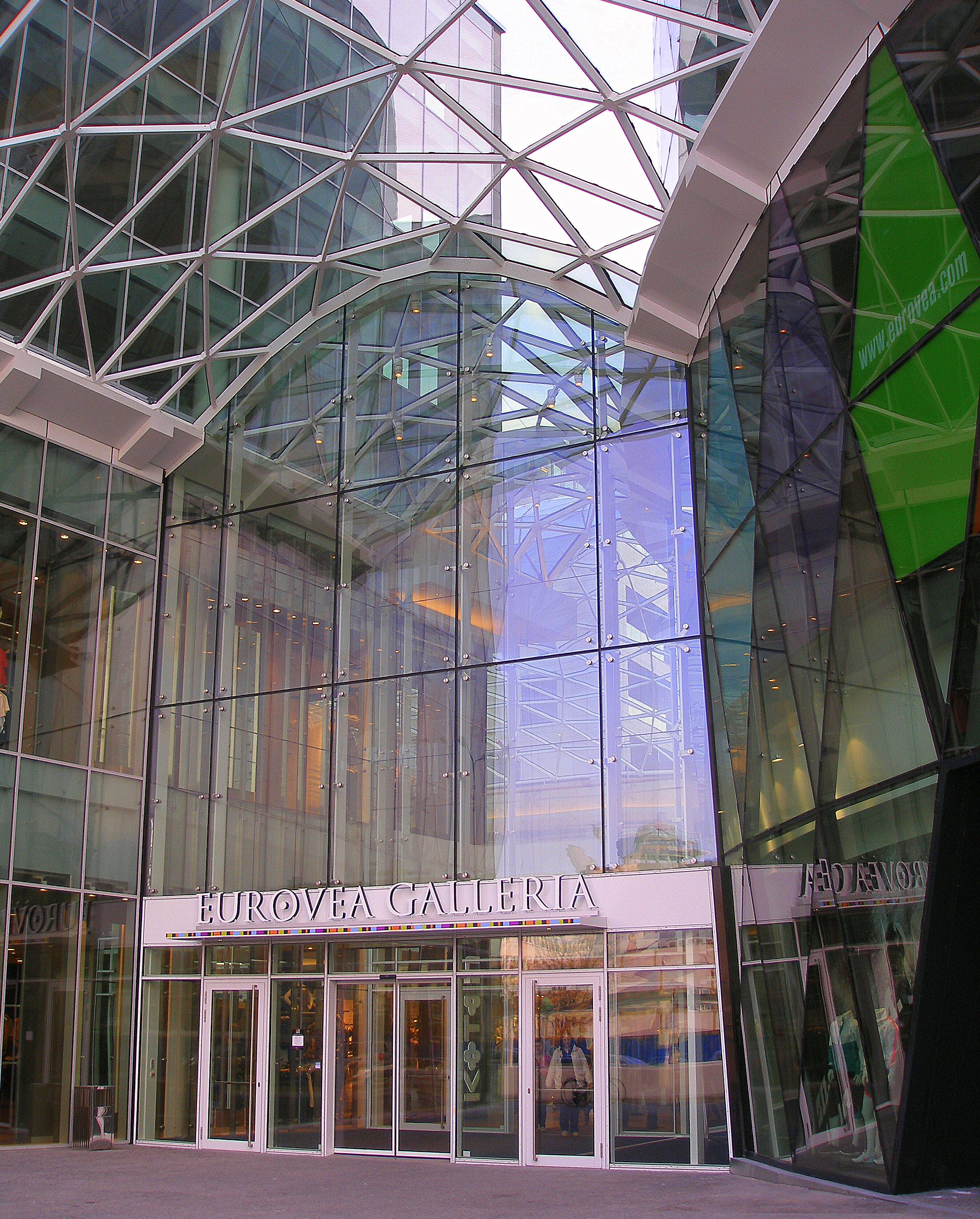
Side entrance

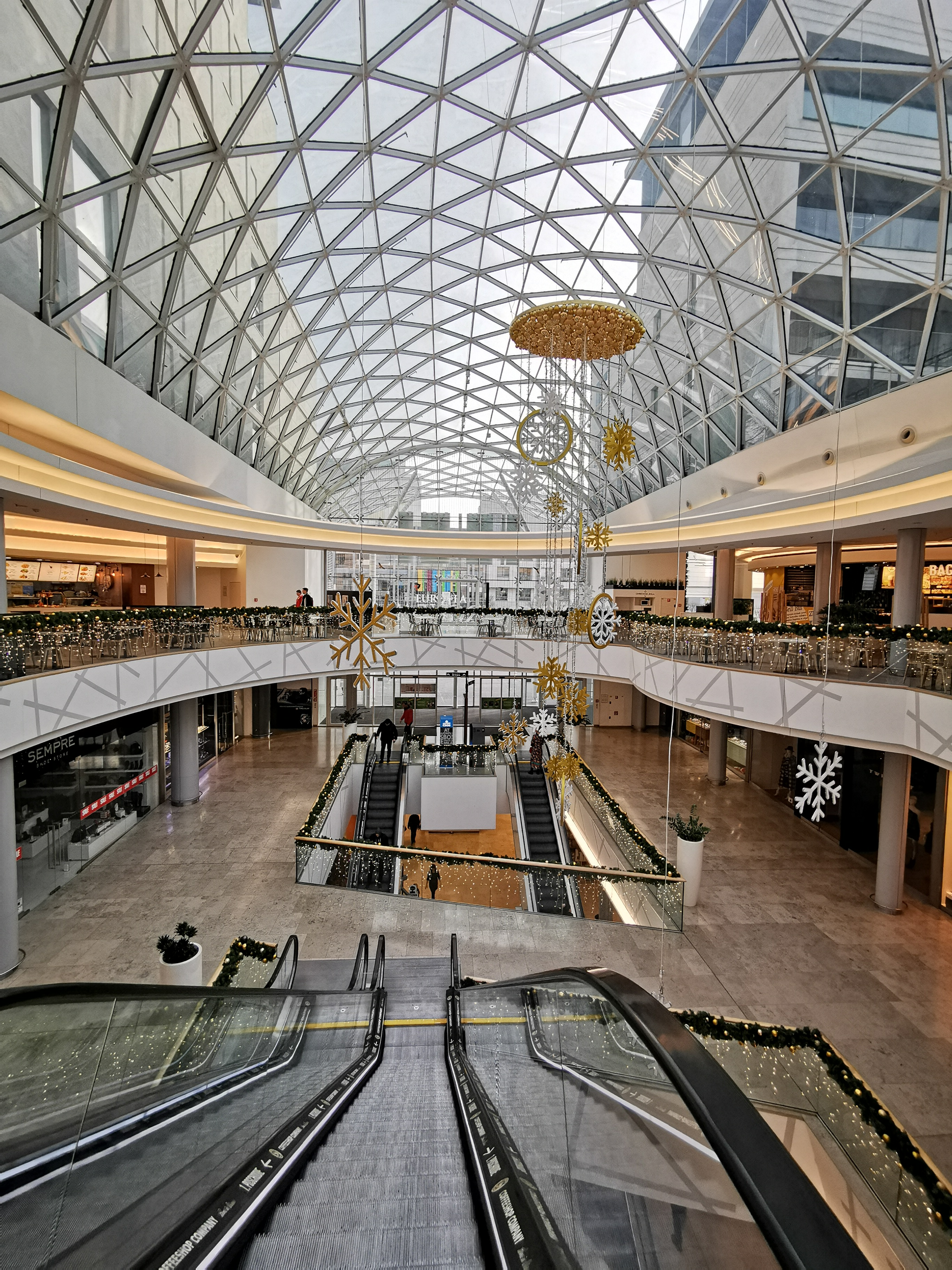

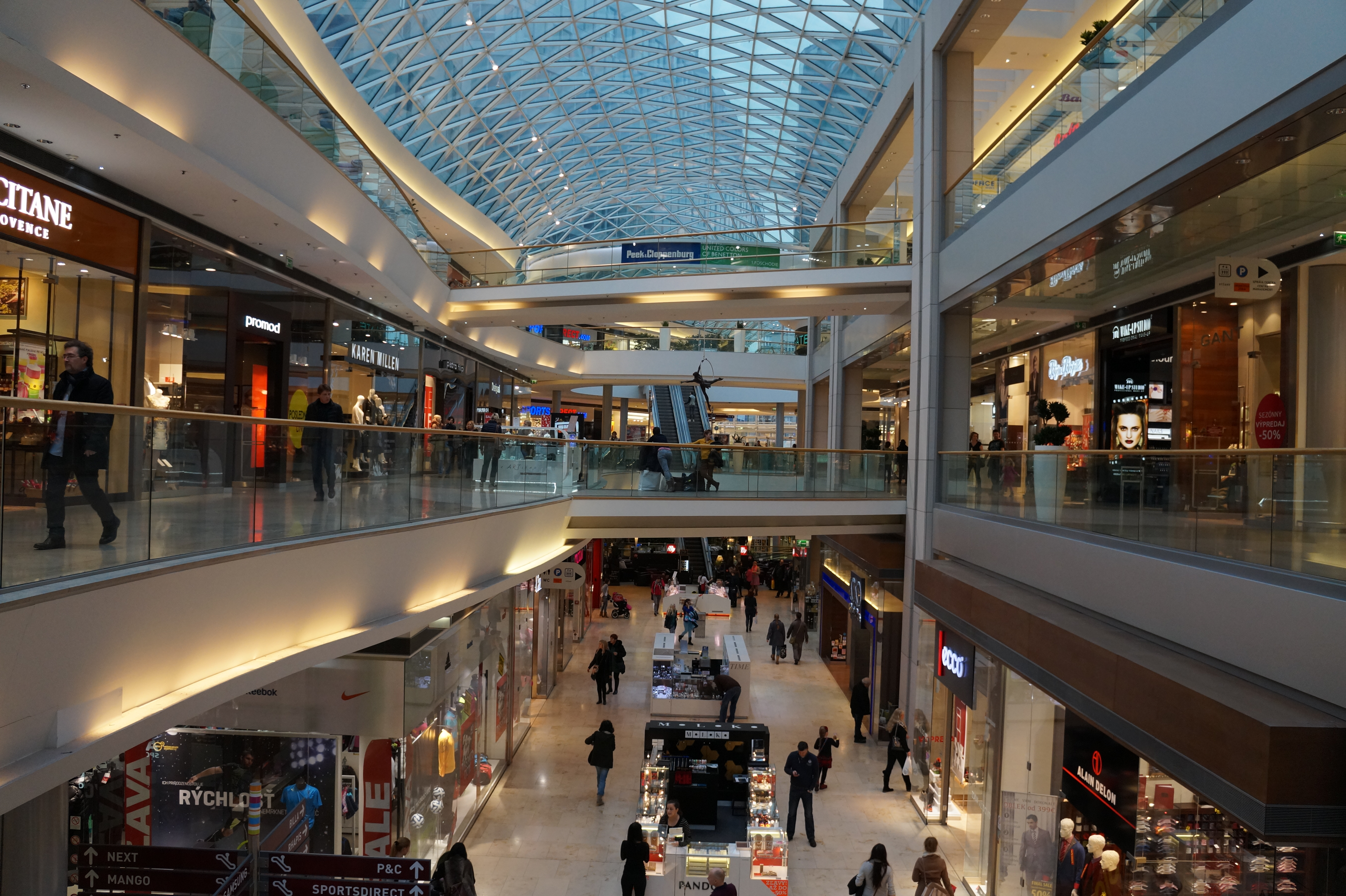

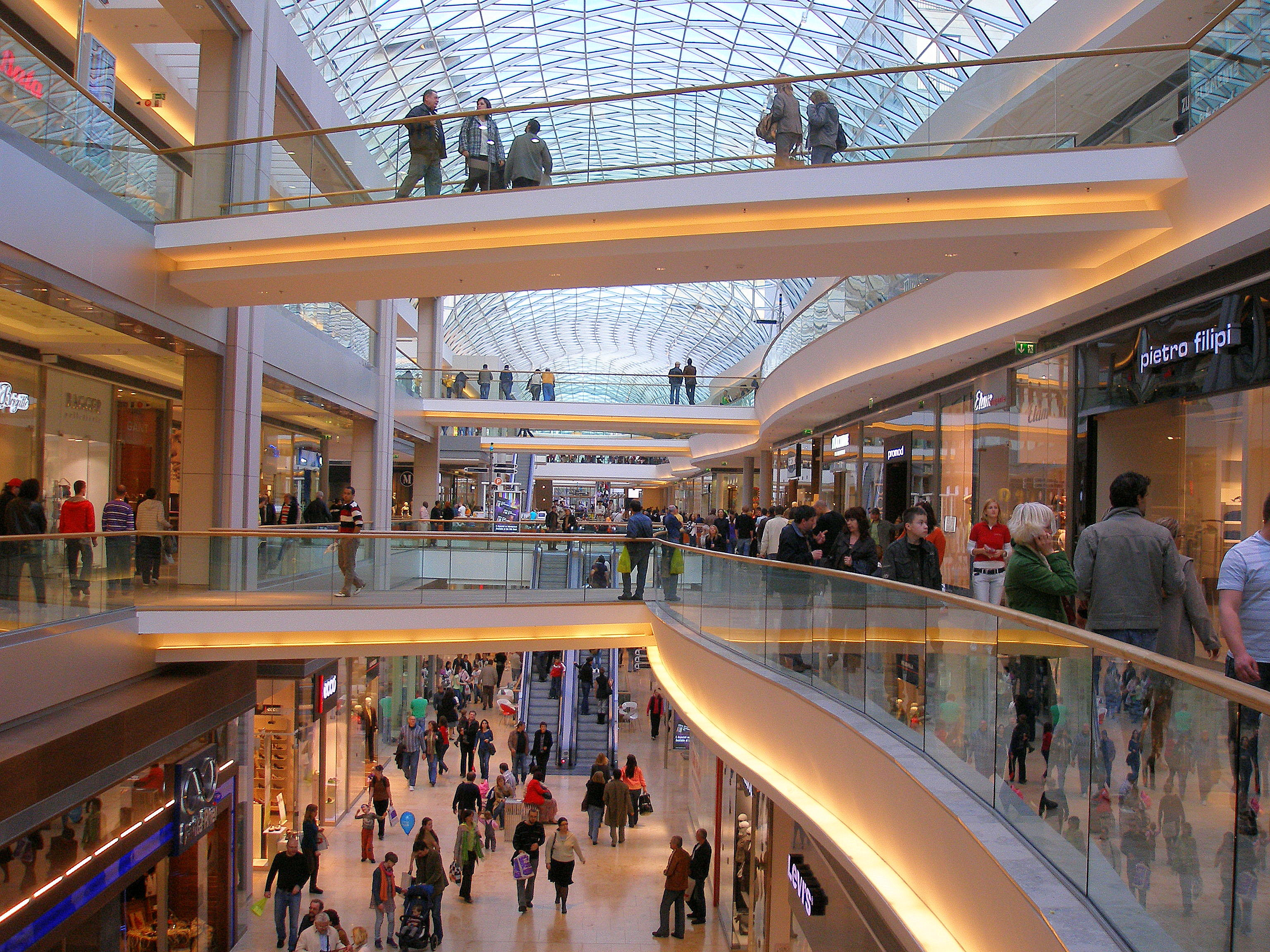

== See also ==
- Eurovea City
- Eurovea Tower
