= Eurovea Tower =

Skyscraper in Bratislava

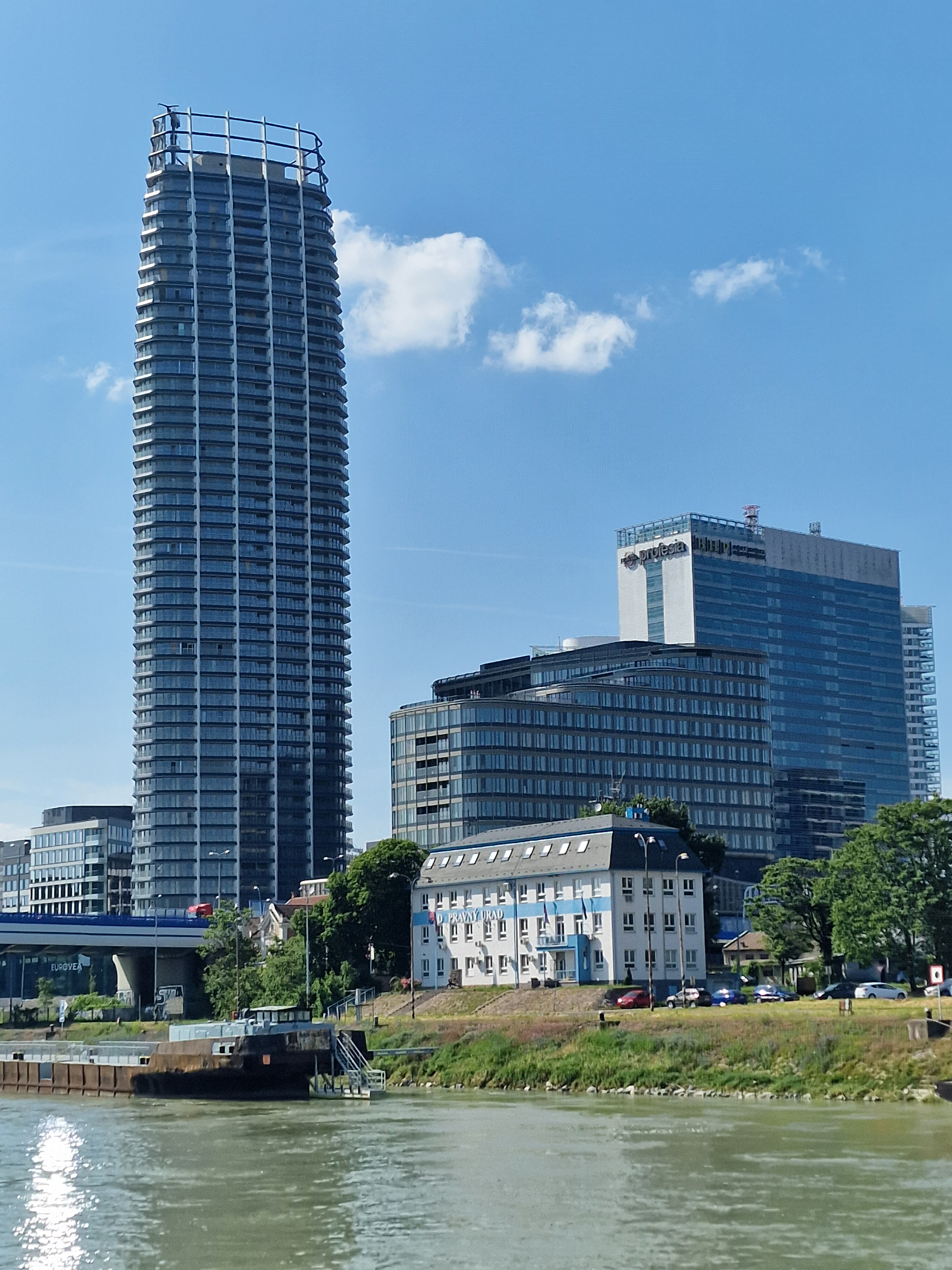
- Eurovea Tower in 2023

General information
- Status: Completed
- Type: Residential
- Location: Ružinov, Bratislava, Slovakia, 821 09 Ružinov, Slovakia
- Coordinates: 48.13983°N 17.12722°E
- Construction started: 2019
- Completed: 2023

Height
- Roof: 168 m (551 ft)

Technical details
- Structural system: Concrete
- Floor count: 45
- Floor area: 12,400 m^{2} (133,000 sq ft)
- Lifts/elevators: 8

Design and construction
- Architect: GFI Architektúra + Dizajn
- Developer: JTRE
- Main contractor: Strabag, Sytiq, VHS-PS

Website
- euroveatower.com

The Eurovea Tower is a premium high-rise residential skyscraper in Bratislava, Slovakia. The building was inaugurated in 2022 and stands at 168 metres (551 ft) tall, being divided into 45 floors. (Note: Slovak language sources cite the building as being 46 stories tall. The difference stems from the difference in designating and counting floors in the European vs. the North American system. This article uses the North American system.) It is the tallest building in Slovakia and the first skyscraper over 150 m (490 ft) built in the country. The tower is part of the Eurovea City complex and it features 408 apartments.

Eurovea Tower was nominated for Construction of the Year 2024 – Public Award and it is the holder of Engineering Chamber Award in Construction in the category Buildings – Absolute Winner. Slovak director Jaroslav Vojtek made a documentary film about the construction of the building titled '168'. The top floor of Eurovea Tower is several meters higher than the peaks of the towers of Bratislava Castle on castle hill.

== Location ==
Eurovea Tower is located in the Eurovea City quarter in the Bratislava city part of Ružinov. The Danube-facing side of the building and its surrounding public spaces are part of the Bratislava Riverfront. Eurovea Tower is located next to the Apollo Bridge over the river Danube.

The landmark tower is part of the second phase of the Eurovea project and is located on Pribinova Street, where several other high-rise buildings are under construction or planned by main developer JTRE. The Eurovea extension features 24,000 m2 (260,000 sq ft) of retail space, 408 apartments in Eurovea Tower and 96 apartments in Eurovea Riverside, 40,300 m2 (434,000 sq ft) of office space, 2,245 parking spots and an extension of the public riverfront (from 8,400 to 15,000 m2 (90,000 to 161,000 sq ft)).

== History ==
Before construction, the site area was occupied by a temporary parking lot. In the past, the area was part of the original Port of Bratislava. Approximately on the site where Eurovea Tower stands today, there used to be a carriage factory. The former industrial zone was largely demolished in the 20th century, and the resulting brownfield land has been slowly revitalized.

The construction of the landmark began in March 2019 and was completed in the fall of 2023. The tower contains 408 apartments and 1,400 parking spaces. The developer is JTRE and the main architects are GFI Architektúra + Dizajn. The tower has six super-fast elevators that can travel at a speed of 6 m/s (22 km/h). These elevators broke the national record for the fastest elevator in the country and the highest superfast elevator in central Europe.

In the future, a tram line is planned to run in front of Eurovea Tower, connecting it with Ružinov and Petržalka.

== Technical Information ==
Technical parameters of the residential complex:

- Height: 168 m
- Number of above-ground floors: 45
- Number of underground floors: 3
- Number of apartments: 408
- Usable floor area: 32,000 m²
- Commercial space area: 1,000 m²
- Total project area (gross above-ground floor area): 155,550 m²
- Number of parking spaces (within the entire Eurovea 2 project, not only for the Eurovea Tower skyscraper): 1,400
- Total number of elevators: 8

== Apartments and Services ==
Eurovea Tower offers a total of 408 residences across 45 above-ground floors. All apartments feature high ceilings and premium interior finishes. The layouts are largely flexible, allowing each owner to customize their inner walls. All apartments have an asymmetrical floor plan with large-format windows spanning the full height of the floor. Each residence includes a terrace with a unique view of various parts of Bratislava. Residents have access to an entrance lobby with a reception desk, and the building is directly connected to the Eurovea Galleria shopping center via a covered passage. Parking is shared with the Eurovea complex.

== Public Spaces ==
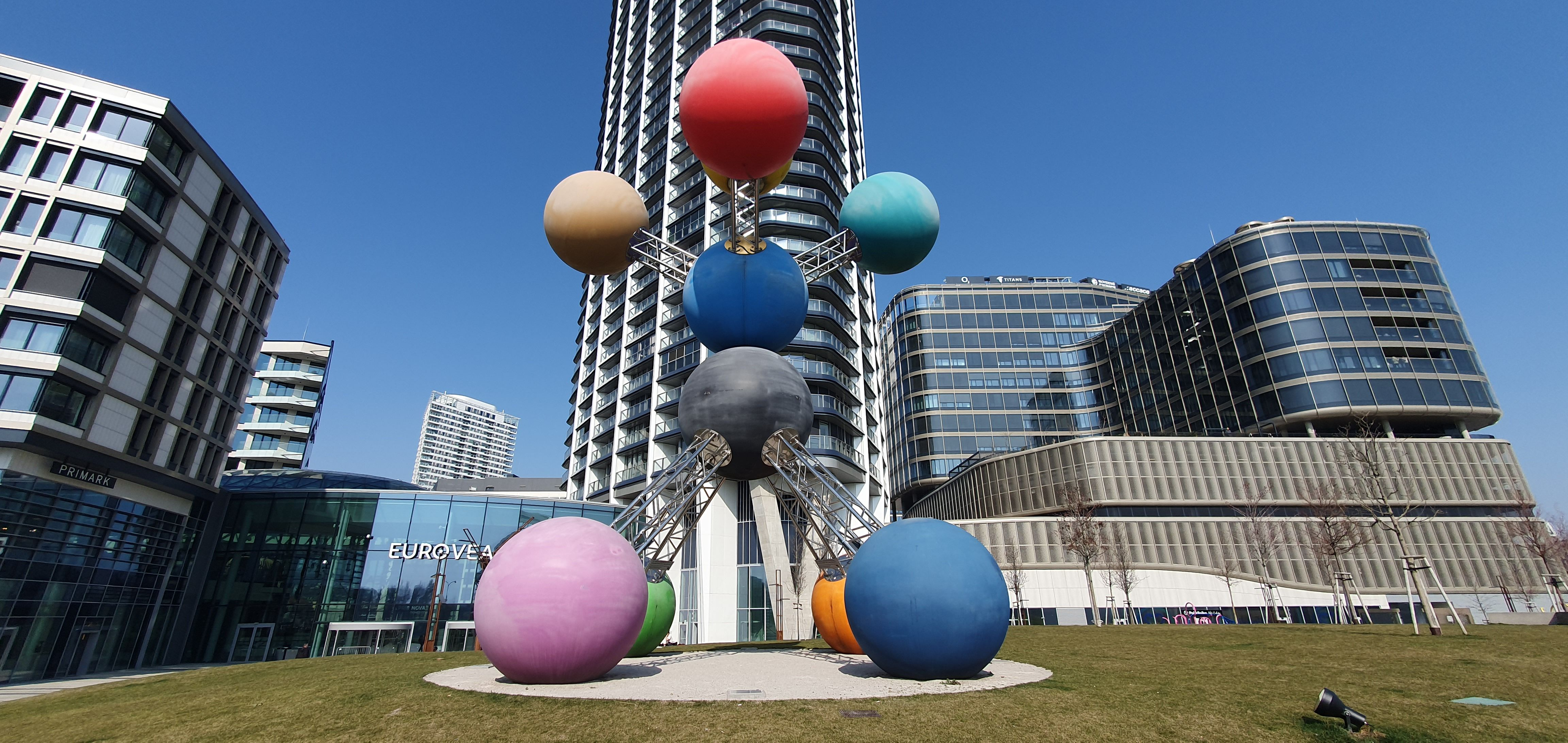
Octahedral Body by Slovak artist Viktor Frešo

Eurovea Tower also includes new public spaces as an extension of the existing promenade along the Bratislava Riverfront. Through the redevelopment of Pribinova Street, designed by Spanish architect Beth Galí, up to 80 percent of car traffic was moved below ground level. This transformation created a fully-fledged urban boulevard with wide sidewalks and a segregated cycle path connected via the Apollo Bridge to the international cycling route on the southern bank of the Danube.

Public spaces feature not only greenery but also water elements. The riverside park covers an area of 25,000 m², and directly next to Eurovea Tower, a square was created featuring Octahedral Body, a 13-meter-high artwork by Slovak artist Viktor Frešo. As part of the landscaping of the new promenade section, minimalist playful objects designed by Amsterdam-based toy designer Luca Boscardin were also installed.

== Gallery ==
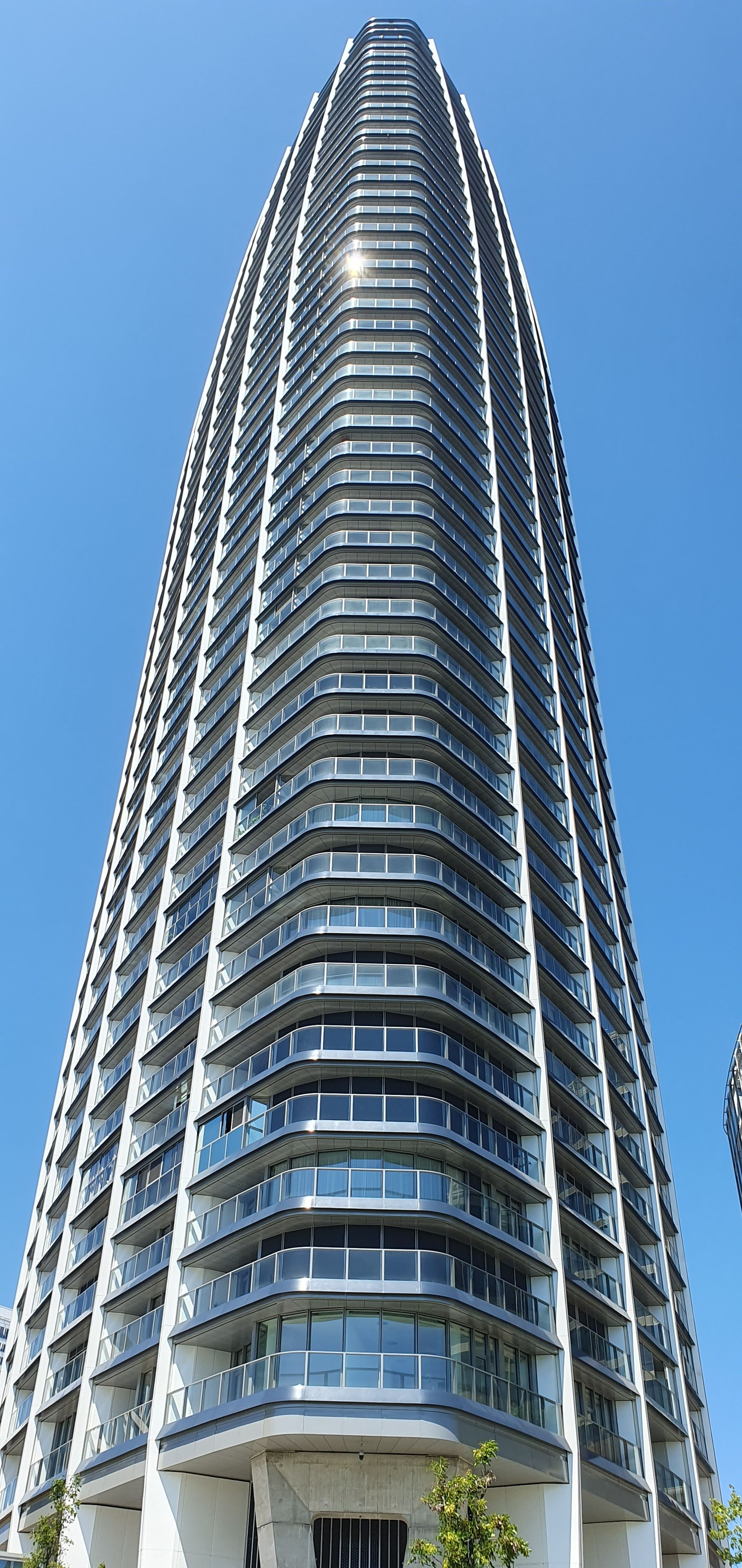
Eurovea Tower in 2026

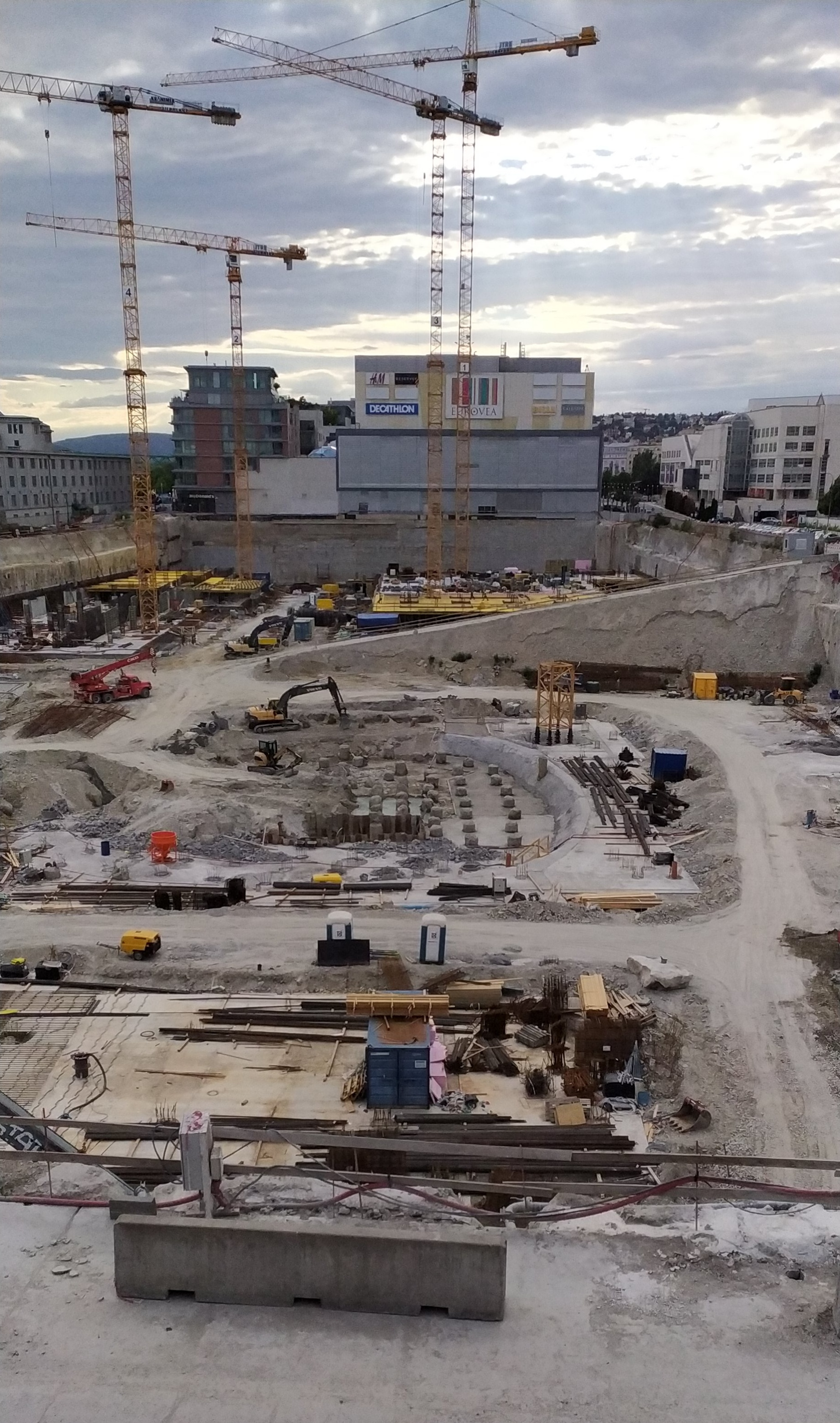
Construction of Eurovea Tower in 2020

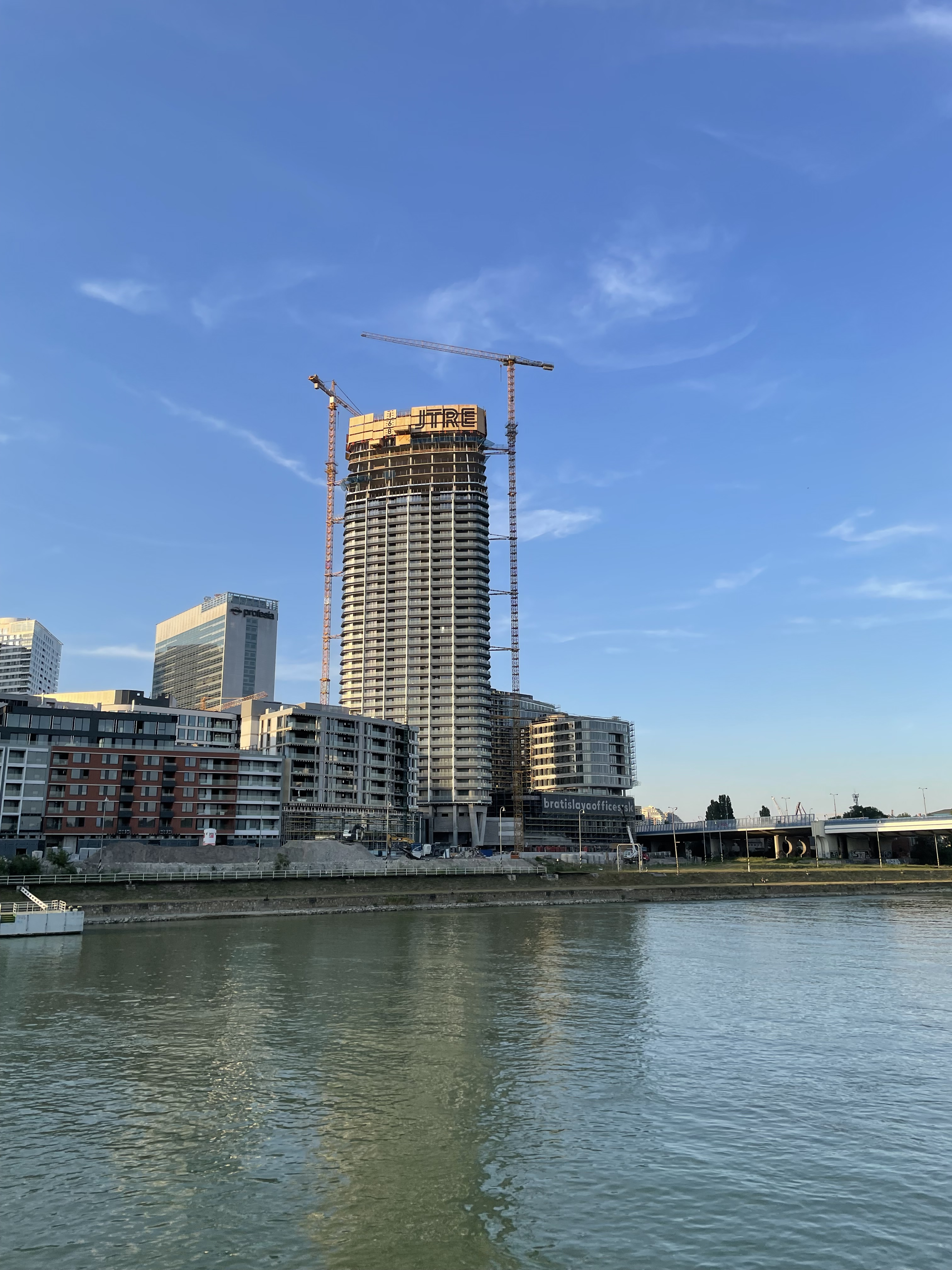
Construction of Eurovea Tower in 2022

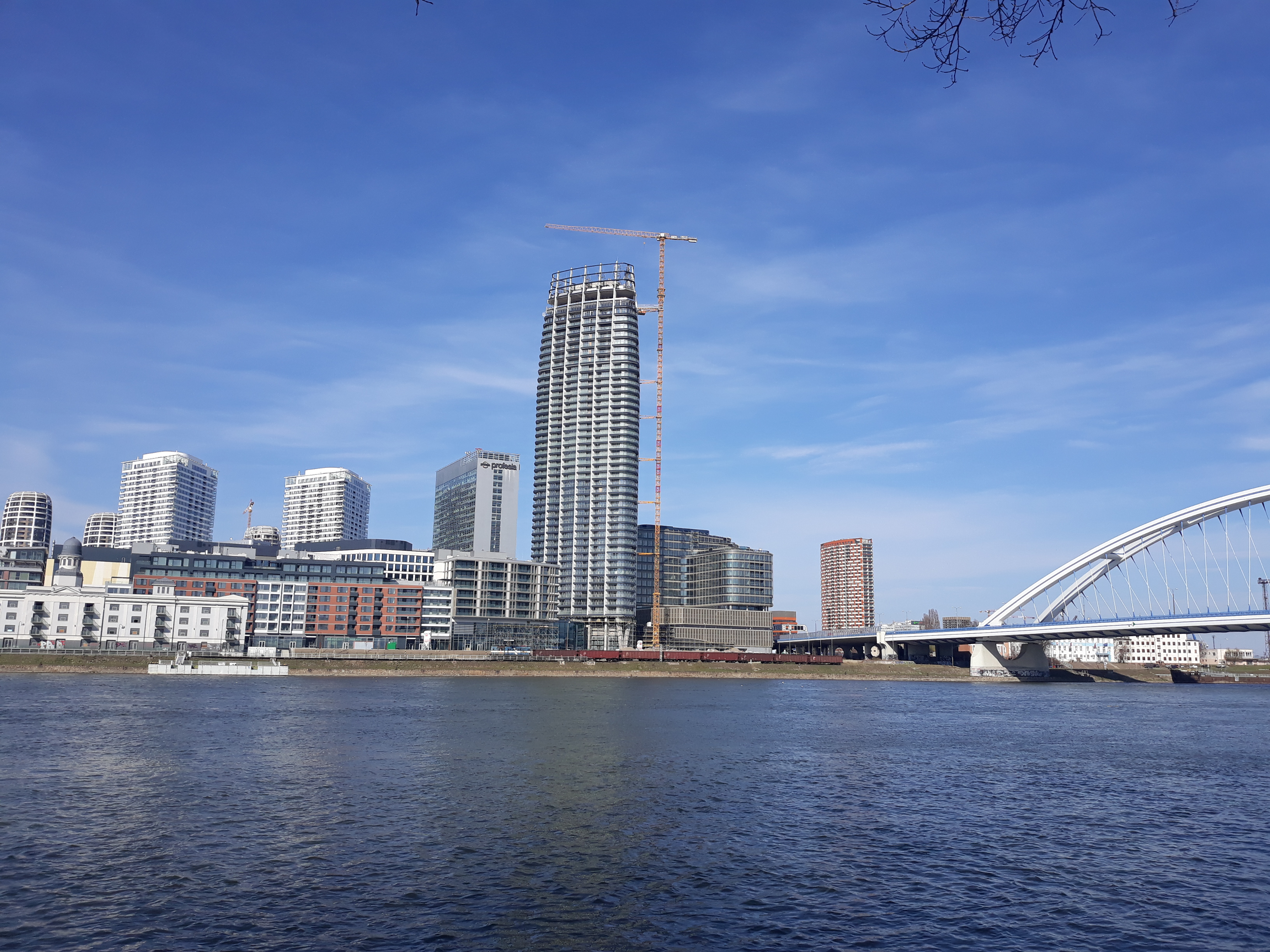
Construction of Eurovea Tower in 2023

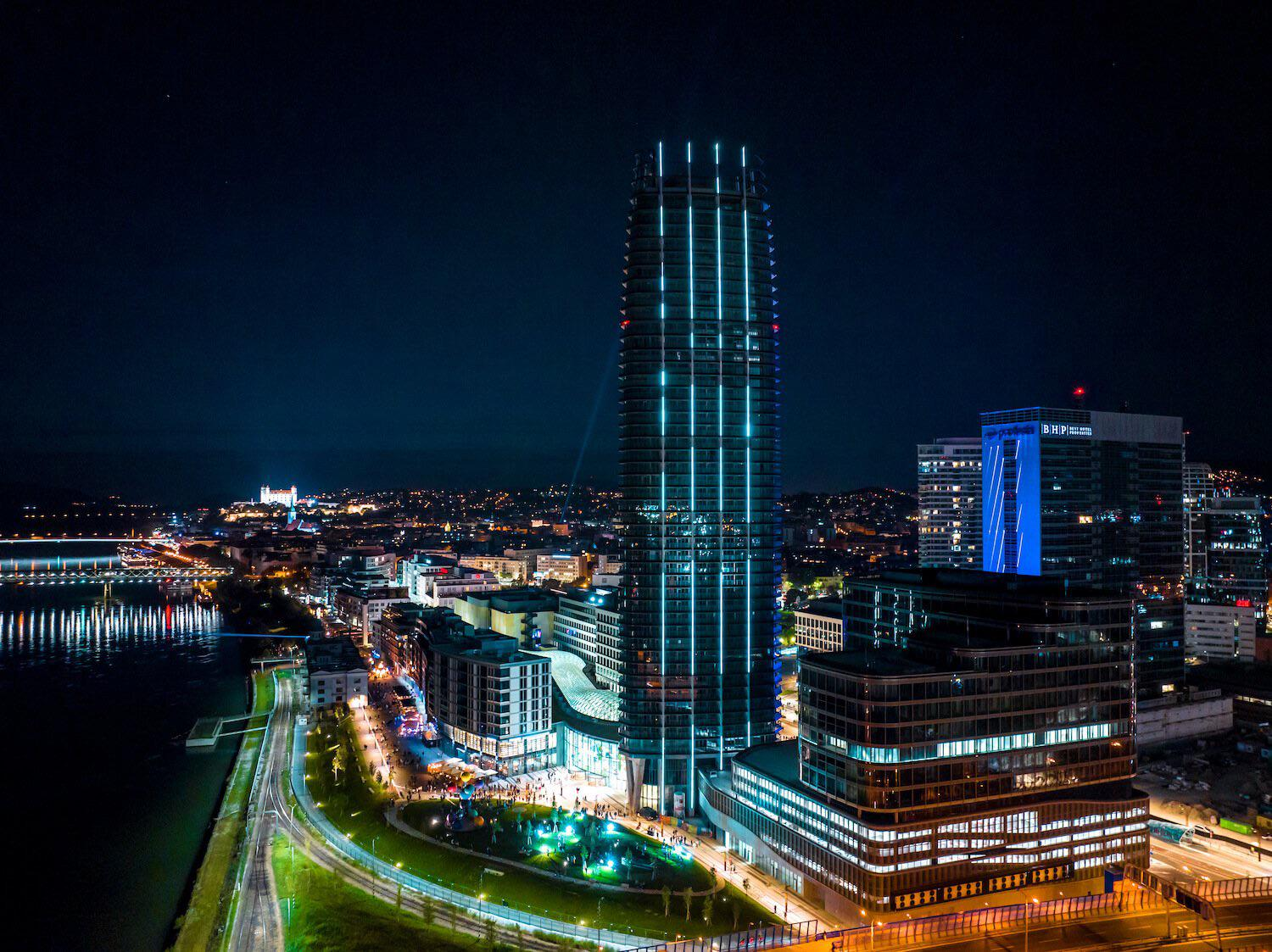
Eurovea Tower at night

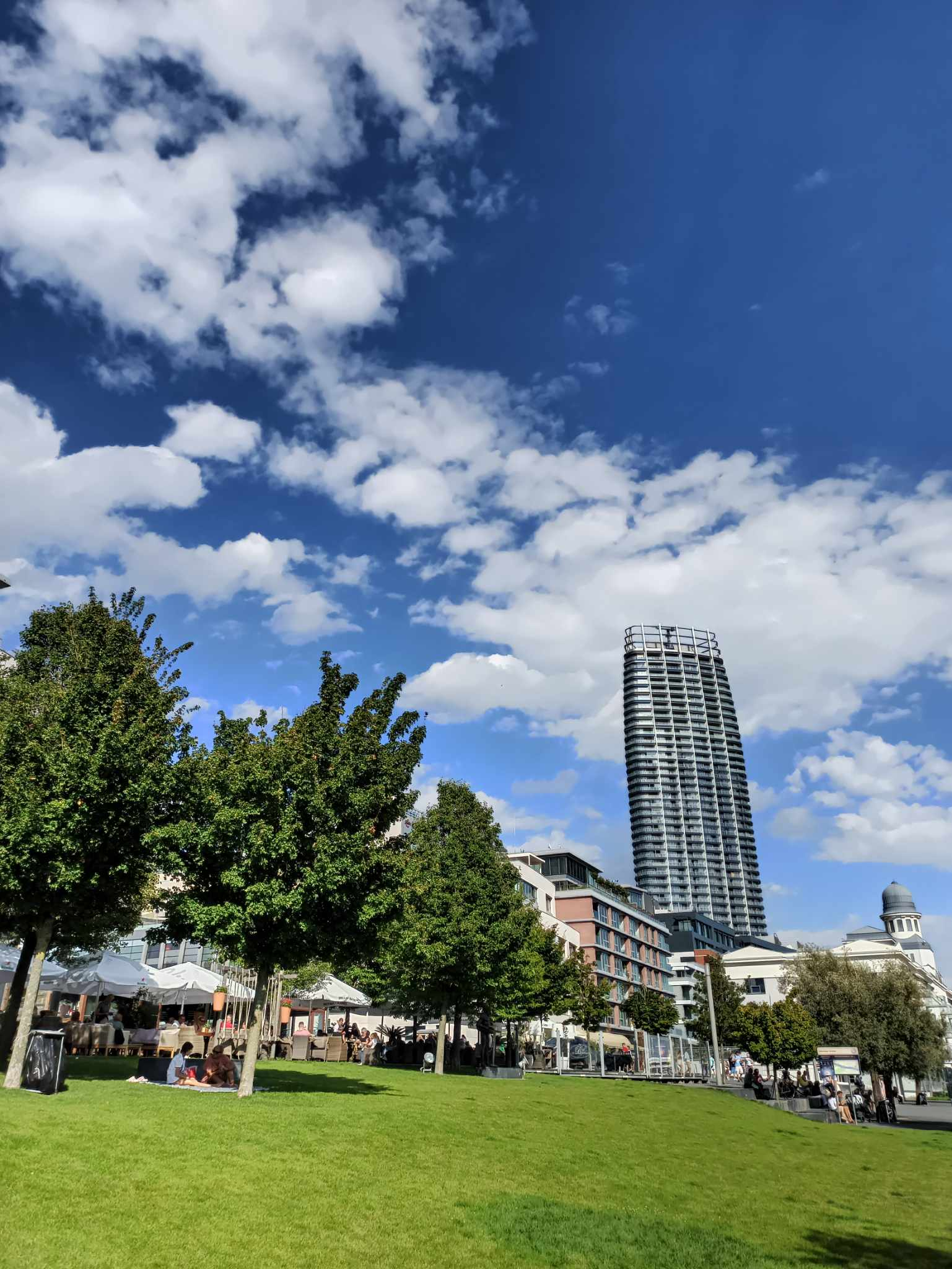
Public spaces around the complex

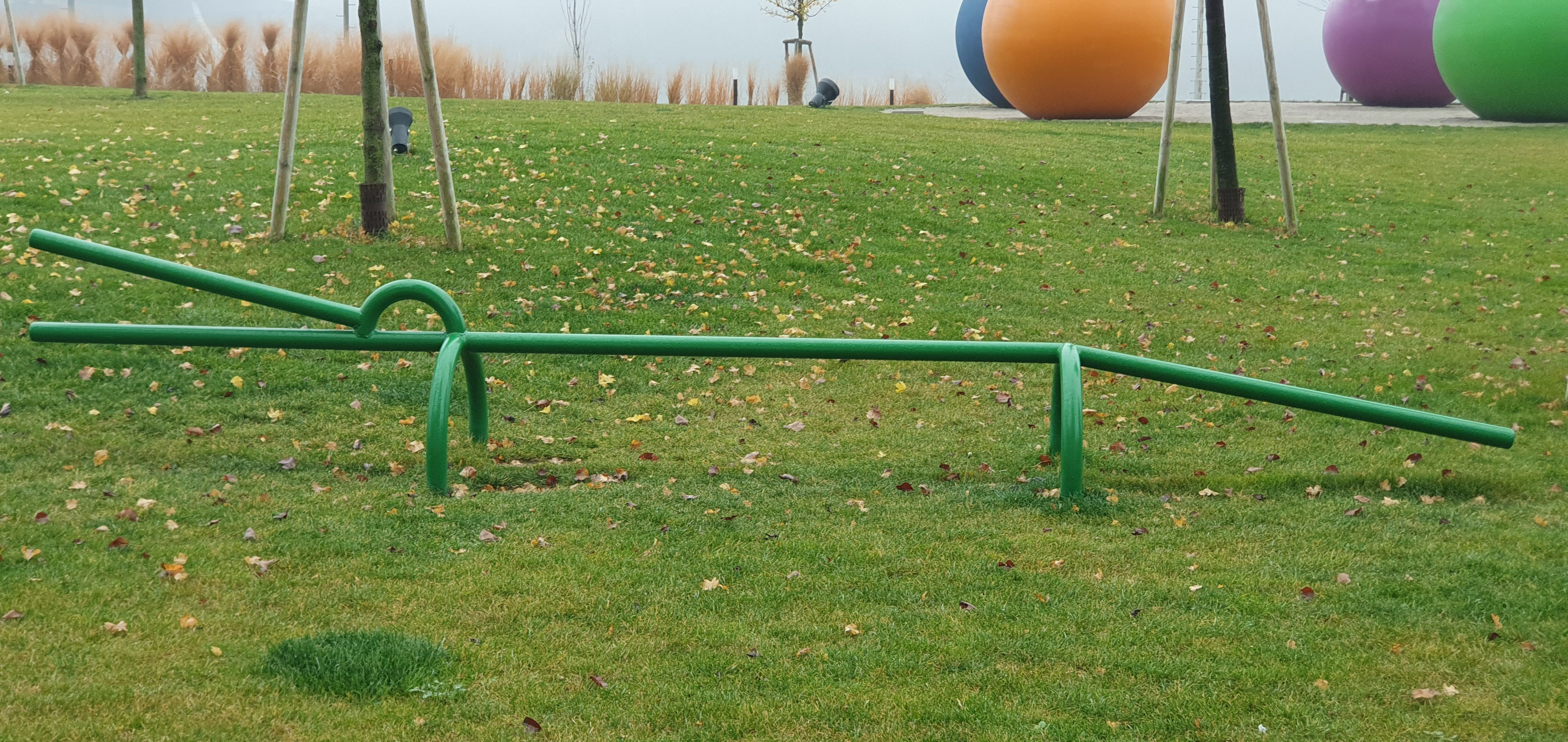
Minimalist playful objects by Luca Boscardin

== See also ==
- List of tallest buildings in Slovakia
- List of tallest buildings in Bratislava
- List of tallest residential buildings

Records
Preceded by Nivy Tower	Tallest building in Slovakia; 2023–present	Succeeded by Incumbent
