= Eurovea City =

Locality in downtown of Bratislava, Slovakia

Coordinates: 48.140676°N 17.120914°E

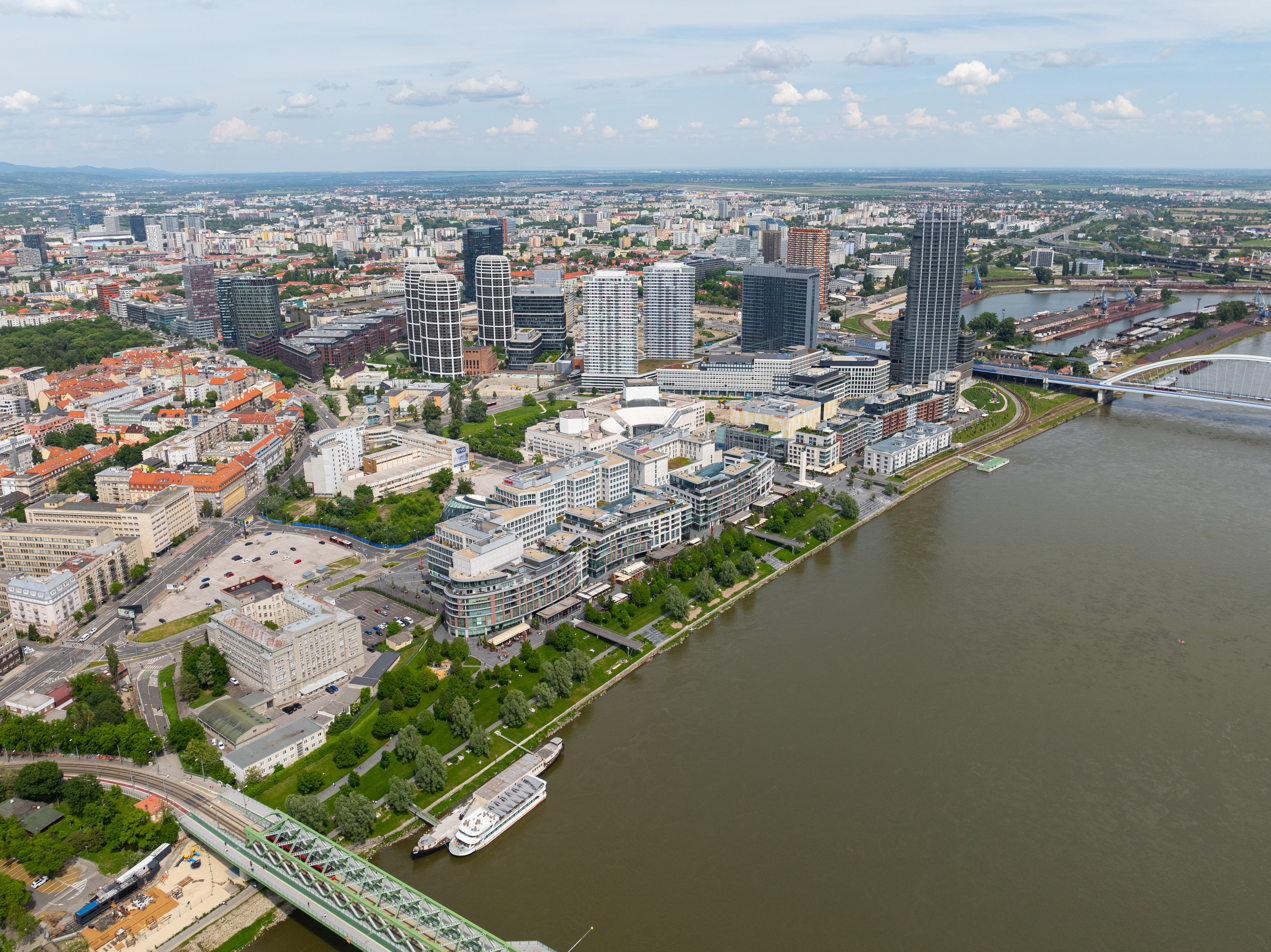
View of new Bratislava downtown with Eurovea City (2024)

Eurovea City is a neighborhood in the downtown area of boroughs Old Town and Ružinov in Bratislava, Slovakia. It features a complex of residential, office and retail buildings developed by JTRE as well as older development and public spaces. It is located between the Old Bridge and the Apollo Bridge, bordered by Landererova street from the north and the river Danube from the south.

Eurovea City is composed of Eurovea (that includes shopping mall Eurovea Galleria, residential skyscraper Eurovea Tower, apartment buildings Eurovea Apartments and Eurovea Riverside, office buildings Pribinova 40, Pribinova 34, Pribinova 4-6-10, hotel Sheraton Bratislava, M. R. Štefánik Square and Eurovea Danube promenade). Other buildings in Eurovea City includes two residential skyscrapers Panorama City Towers with Panorama park, mixed-use building Ganz House, office buildings Tower 115, Landererova 12, Pribinova 19, national cultural monument Warehouse No. 7 and new building of Slovak National Theatre.

In 2024 Dutch architectural studio KCAP won Eurovea City Concept Design Competition for new project in Eurovea City. Two residential skycrapers 260 m (850 ft) and 180 m (590 ft) tall will stand beside the Eurovea Tower. The two towers will be the highest buildings in Slovakia.

== History of Eurovea ==
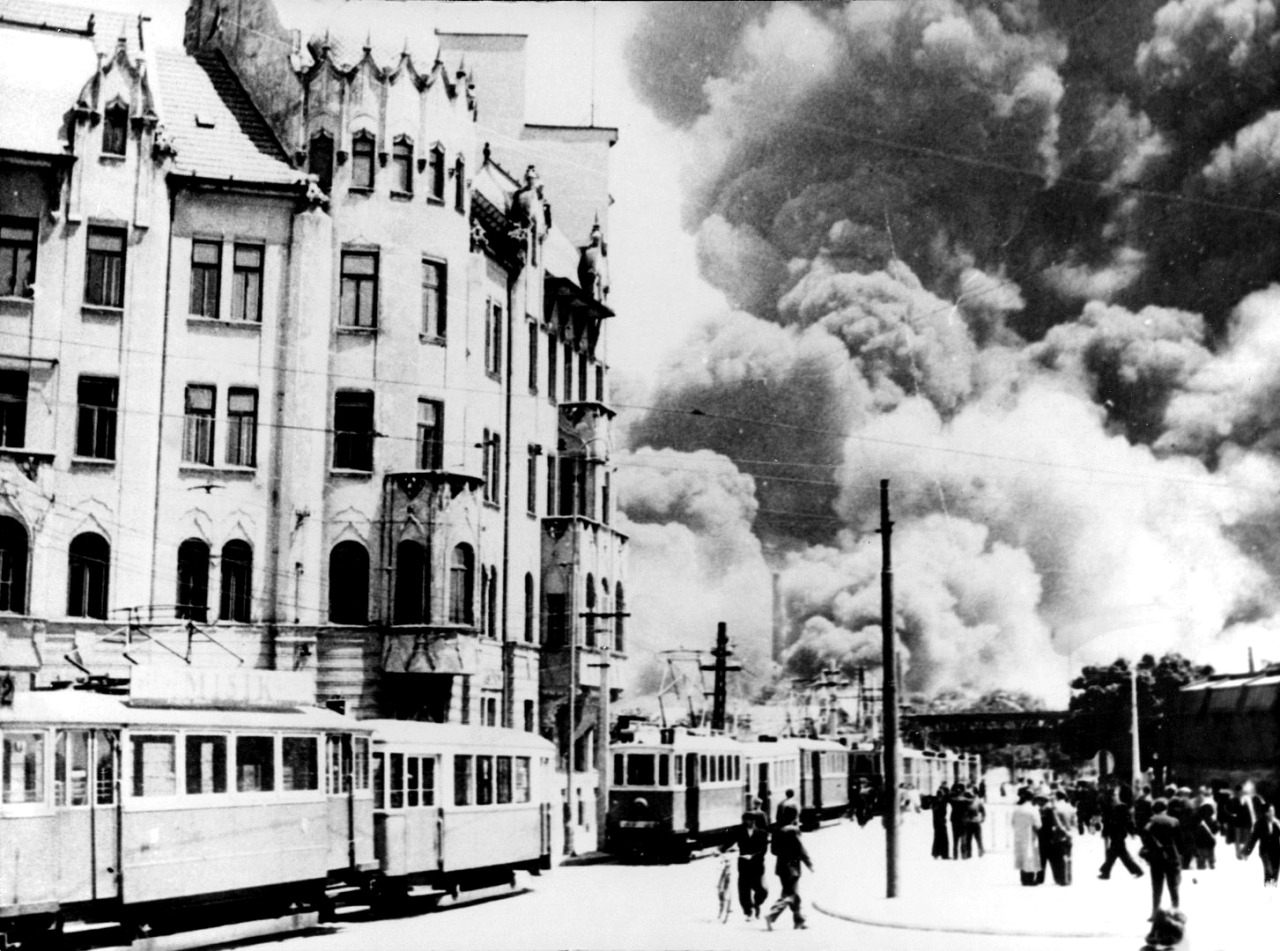
Allied bombing of Bratislava during World War II in 1944

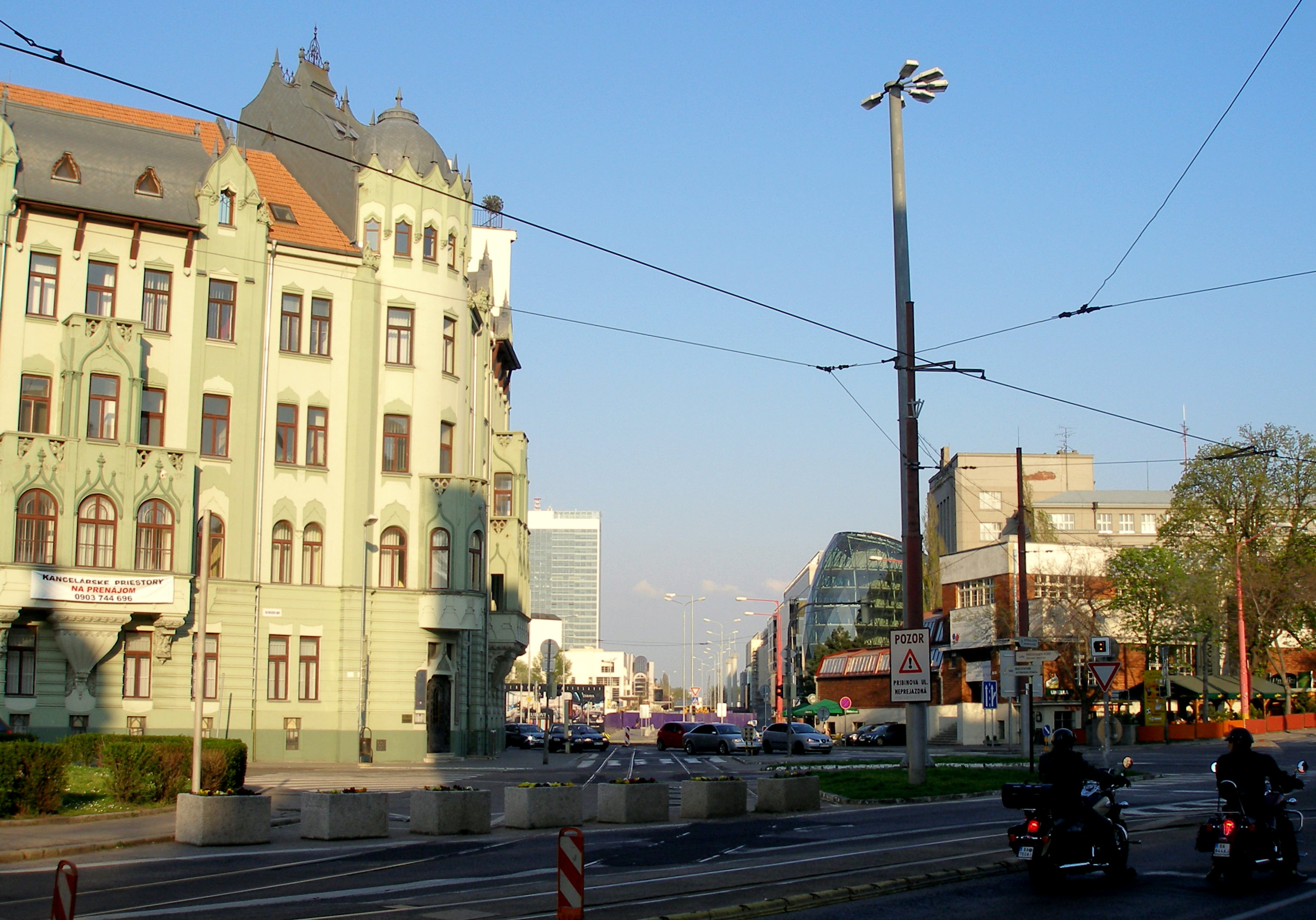
View of Eurovea from Šafárik square

The construction of Eurovea contributed to a significant revitalization of the original industrial area of the city which was hit by the United States bombing in 1944 during World War II.

Before the construction of Eurovea, the area featured numerous older small buildings along Pribinova Street, including the Stoka Theater that were demolished. The riverfront area was almost empty. At the beginning of construction, in the area left only three buildings, that are currently part of Eurovea City - new building of Slovak National Theatre, national cultural monument Warehouse No. 7 and office building Tower 115.

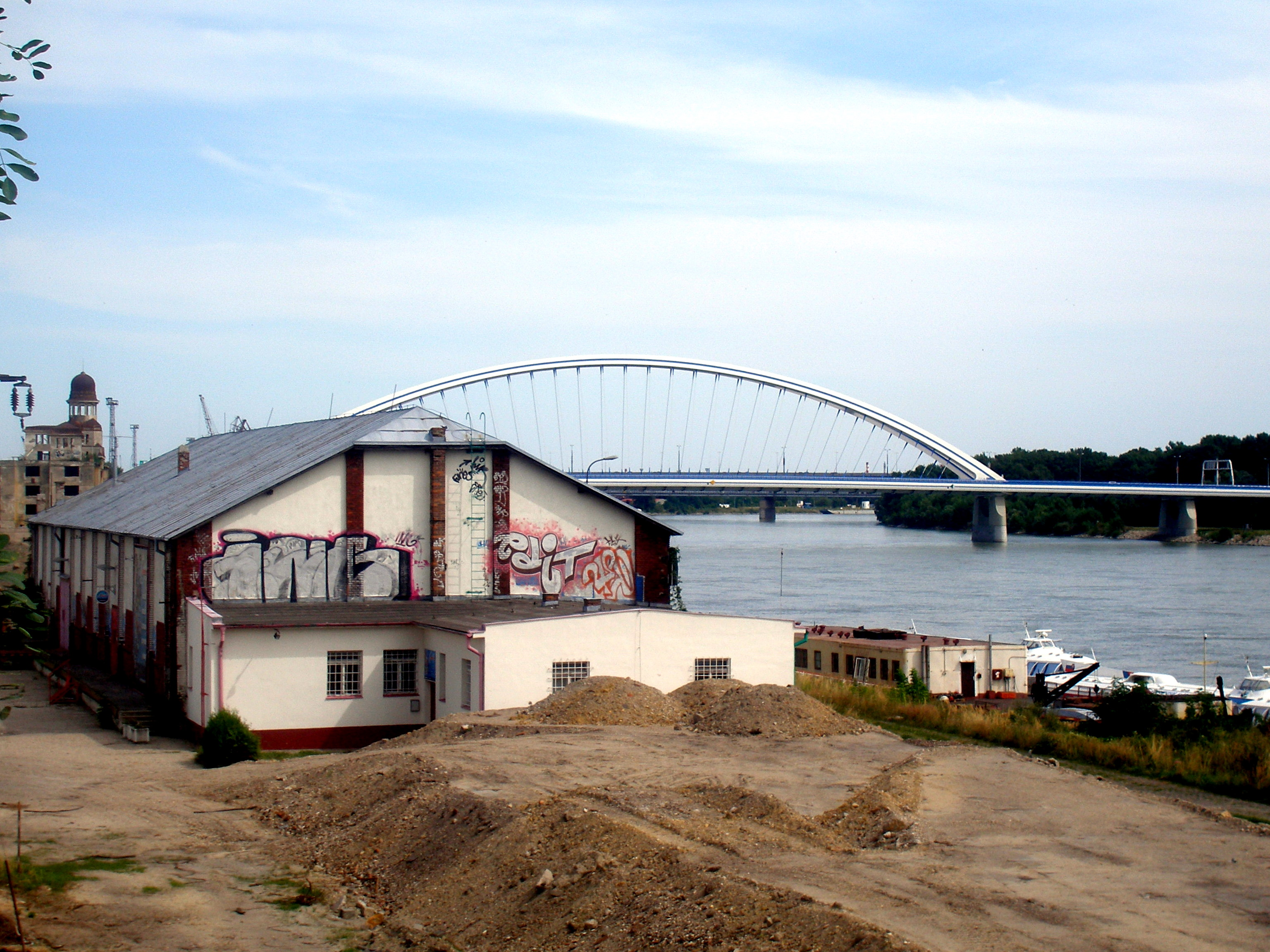
Area of Eurovea in 2006

Irish real estate development company Ballymore Group purchased the land of the Eurovea area in 2002 for 550 million Slovak korunas (€18 million). Construction of Eurovea Phase I started in July 2006, the Sheraton Bratislava Hotel opened in February 2010 with the rest of the complex opening in March 2010.

Peter Korbačka, Chairman of J&T Real Estate and partner of J&T Finance Group, acquired the complex through the Cypriot company Trenesma Limited for €364 million in the summer of 2014, becoming the largest real estate transaction in Central and Eastern Europe at that time. It was the largest transaction in the history of Slovakia until 2021, when Investment bank Wood & Company and Tatra Asset Management have acquired the Aupark Bratislava shopping centre from Unibail-Rodamco-Westfield for €450 million.

== Eurovea ==
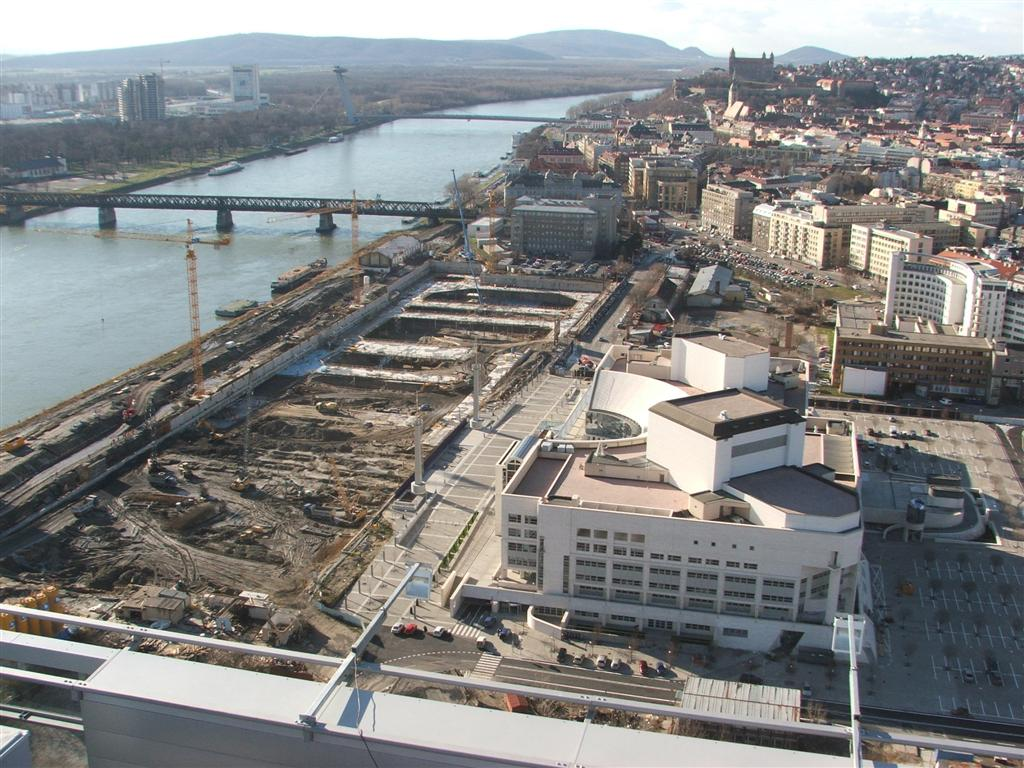
Phase I under construction in 2007

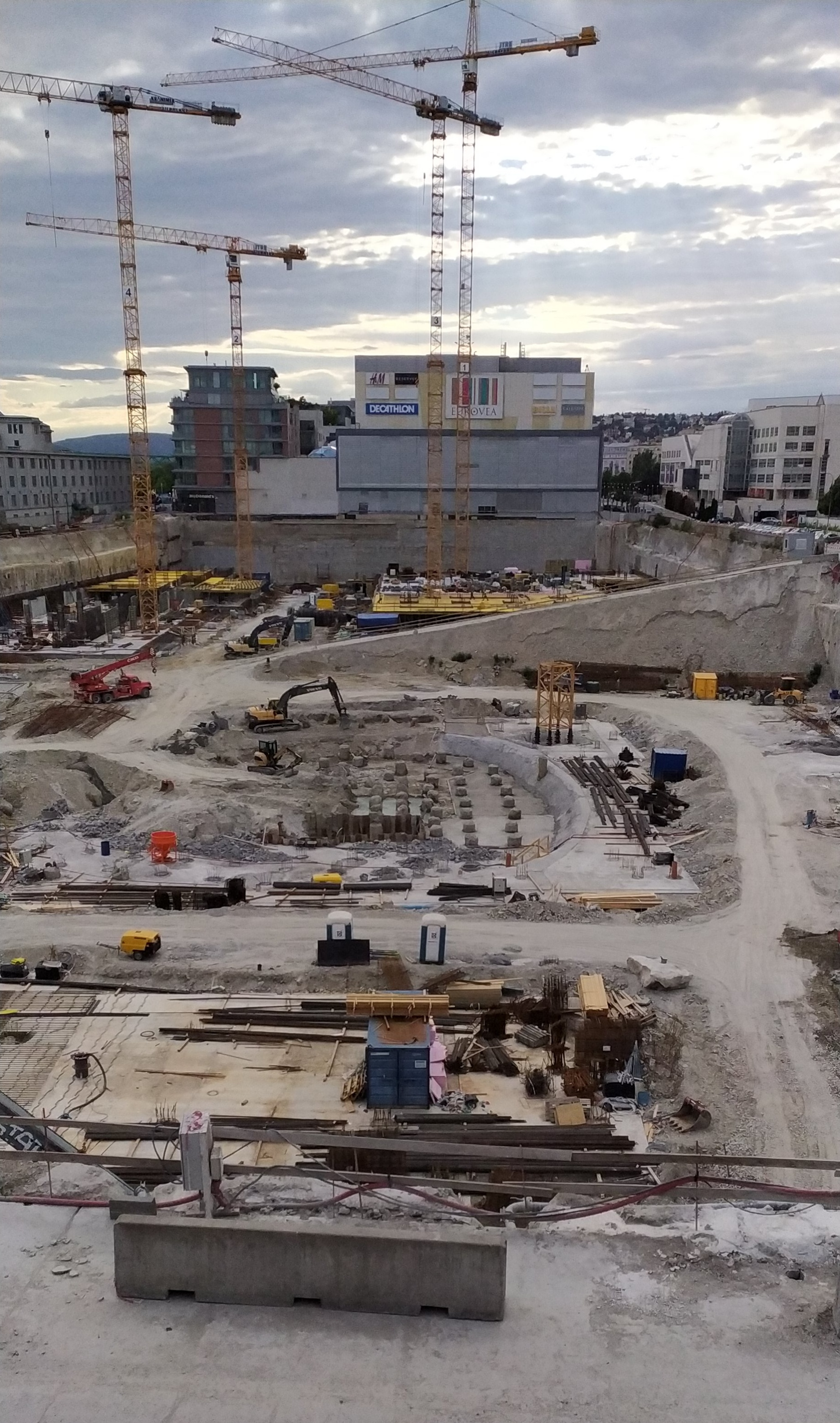
Phase II under construction in 2020

Eurovea is a premium mixed-use building complex under construction in Bratislava, Slovakia. The complex is located in the Old Town, between the Old Bridge and the Apollo Bridge, bordered by Landererova street from the north and the river Danube from the south. Eurovea City connects the Bratislava Riverfront with the city center and offers stores and leisure time facilities while housing businesses, apartments and a hotel.

Eurovea is the major part of Eurovea City. Eurovea is a complex of buildings located in the area called Zóna Pribinova - nábrežie, part of the Pribinova Zone, an area of Bratislava that is divided between the Dunajská neighborhood of the Old Town borough and the Nivy neighborhood of the Ružinov borough. It is bordered by the Pribinova Street from the north, building of the Ministry of Interior of the Slovak Republic from the west, the river Danube from the south and Košická Street from the east, covering an area of 86,155 meters squared. The Complex were divided into two phases of construction.

Phase I of the Eurovea complex was developed by Ballymore Properties at the cost of €350 million and it opened after four years of construction in 2010.

Original estimated plans to finish Phase I was in 2007 or 2008, but the construction was postponed mainly because of the Great Recession.

Eurovea Phase II feature the skyscraper Eurovea Tower with height of 168 m (551 ft) and 46 floors above the ground. Construction started at the end of 2019 and finished at the end of 2023. The whole investment cost approximately €300 million.

=== Phase I (2007-2010) ===
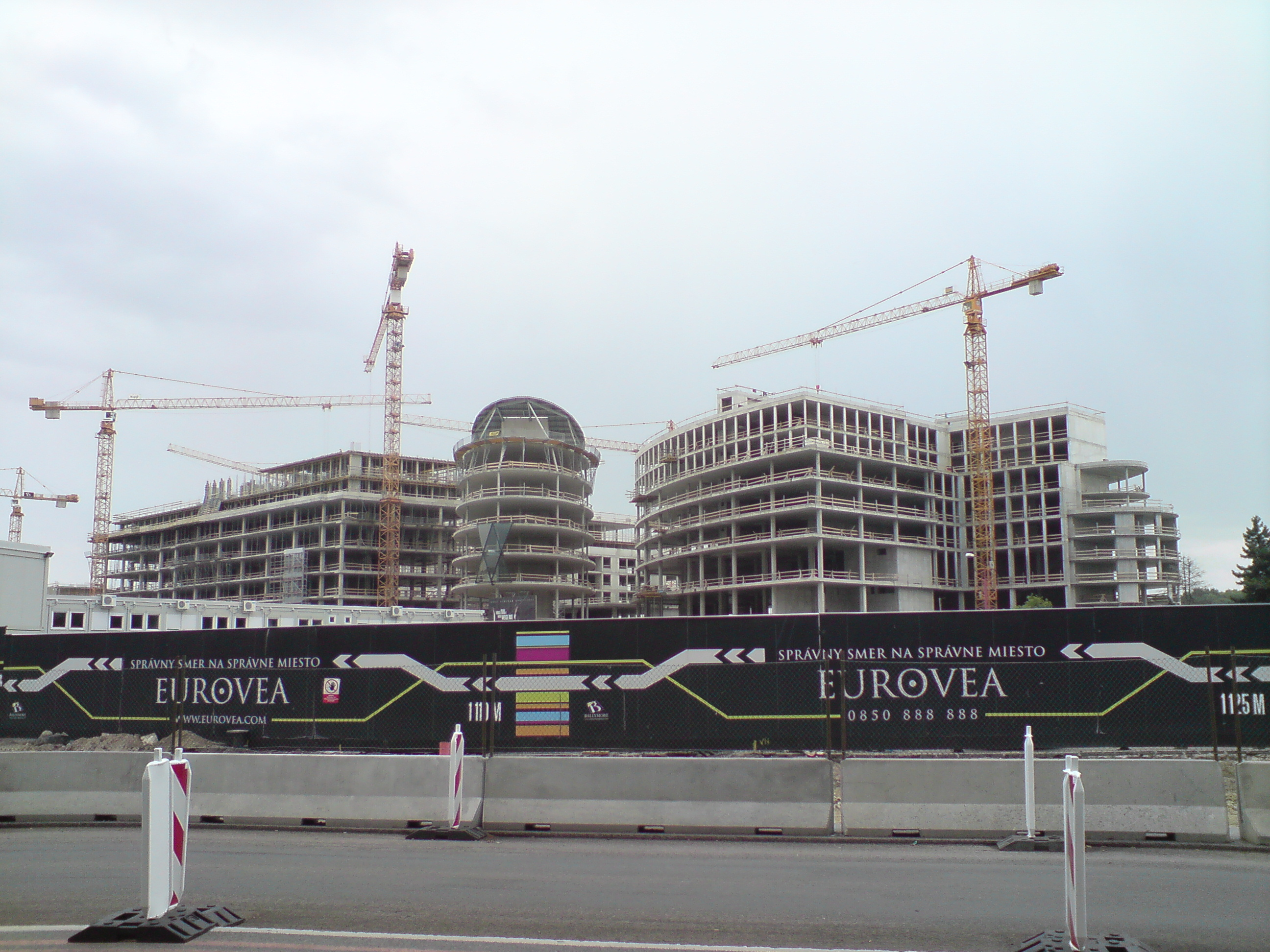
Construction of Eurovea in 2008

Eurovea Phase I covers an area of 4.6 hectares (11 acres) and offers 24,500 m^{2} (264,000 sq ft) of office space, 235 apartments and 1,800 parking spaces.

It consists of the Eurovea Galleria shopping mall including leisure facilities (cinema, casino, swimming pool and fitness), apartment complex Eurovea Apartments (formerly River Place), office complex Eurovea Central (formerly Pribina Place), the 5-star Sheraton Bratislava Hotel and part of the Bratislava Riverfront.

The area includes the M. R. Štefánik Square (Námestie Milana Rastislava Štefánika) and the historical Warehouse No. 7. Almost two thirds of the Eurovea Phase I area are covered by green and public areas. Their construction cost was approximately €13 million and they belong to the city of Bratislava. The public area opened to the public on March 26, 2010.

=== Phase II (2019-2023) ===
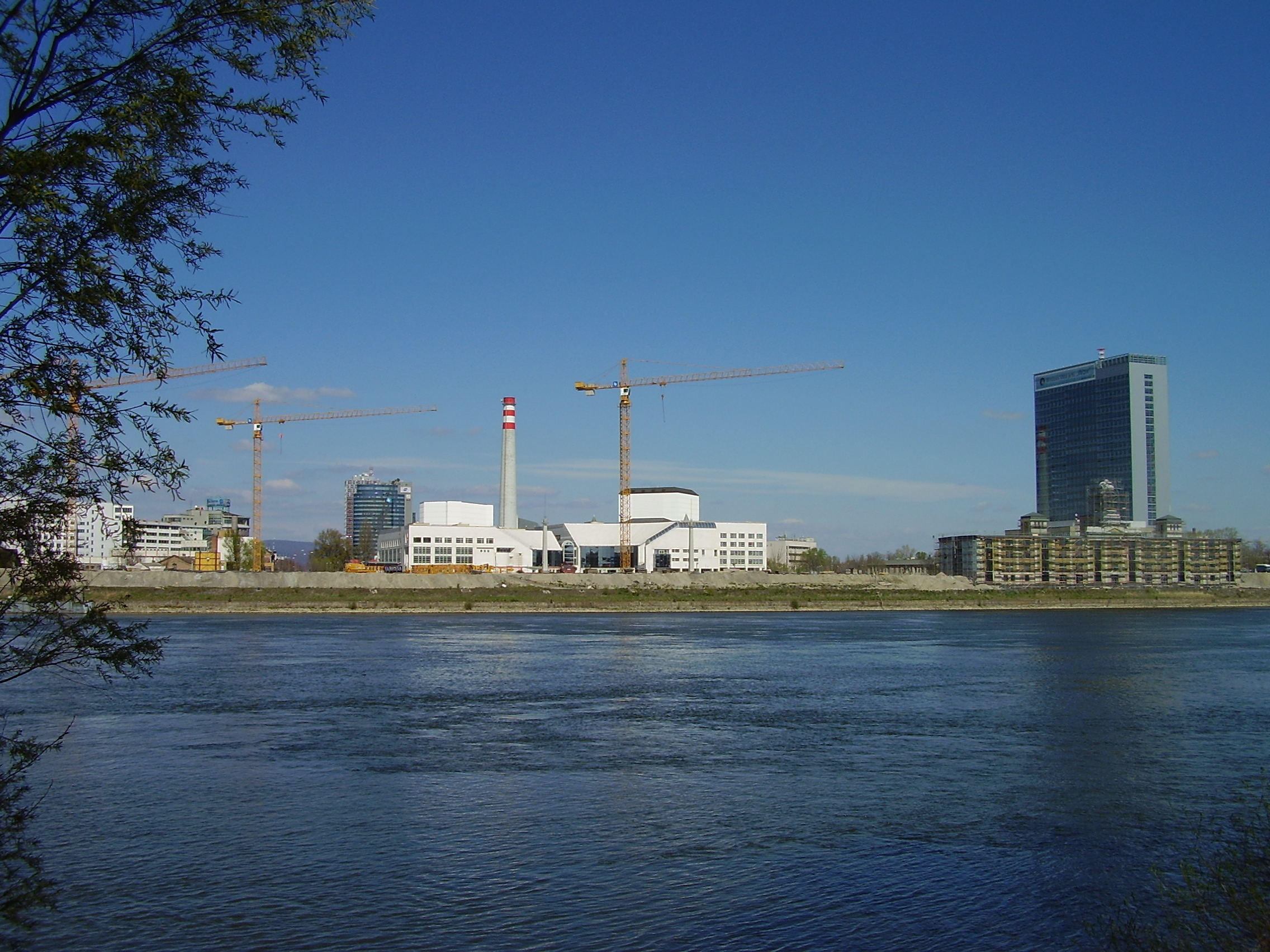
Danube waterfront at the beginning of construction in 2007

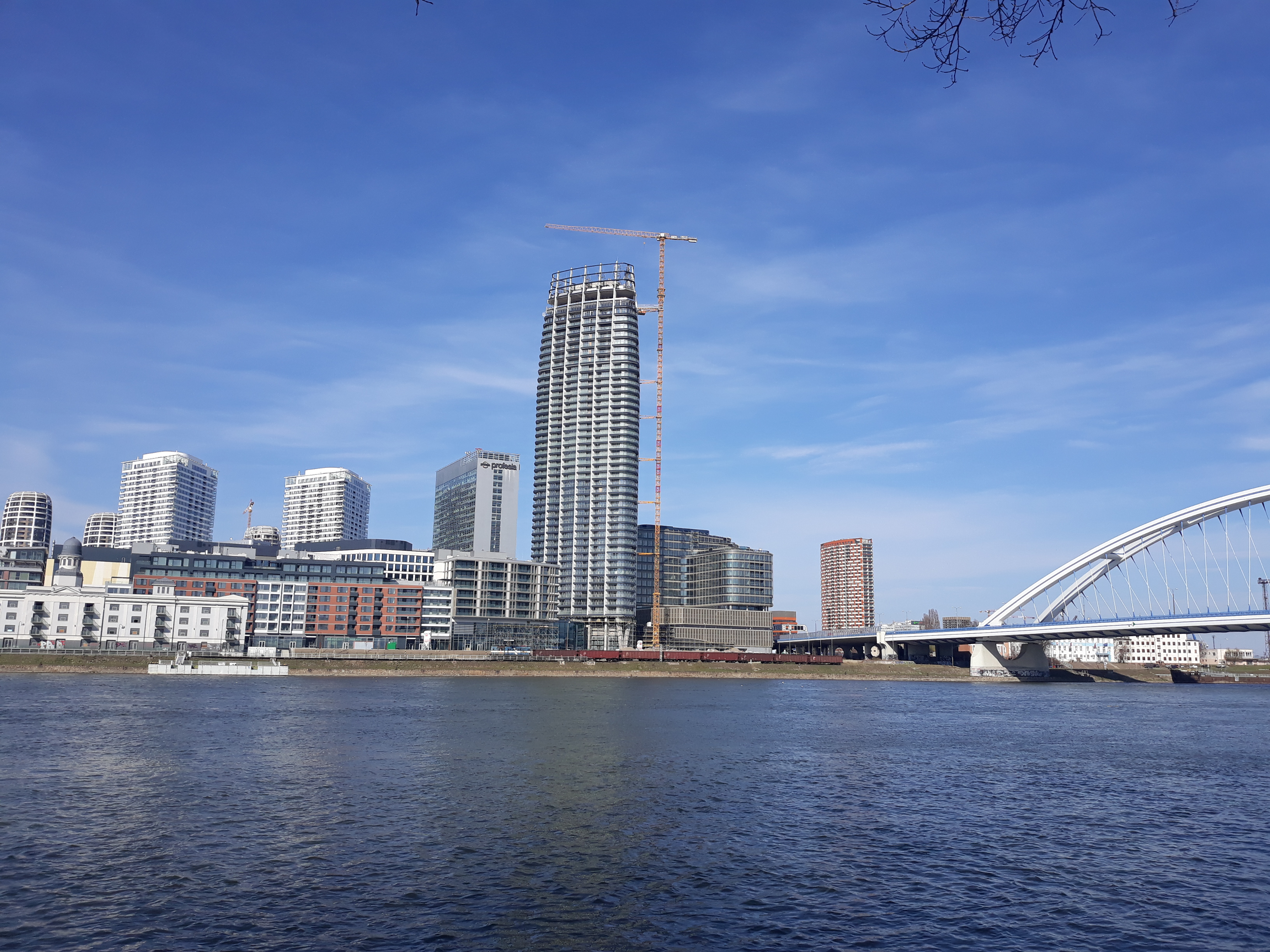
Danube waterfront with Eurovea City in 2023

In Phase II, developer J&T Real Estate extended retail space by adding 24,000 m^{2} (260,000 sq ft), added 40,300 m^{2} (434,000 sq ft) of office space and 2.245 parking spots, extended green area on the riverfront by two times (from 8,400 to 15,000 m^{2} (90,000 to 161,000 sq ft)) and build residential building Eurovea Riverside with 96 apartments. The most important landmark in the extended complex is residential skyscraper Eurovea Tower, with 46 floors, 389 apartments, and height of 168 m (551 ft).

Phase II finished at the end of 2023. The shopping mall introduced several newcoming retail brands in the Slovak market, including Primark.

== Buildings ==
Eurovea City consisting of the following buildings:

=== Shopping ===
Name	Image	Completion year	Notes	Ref.
Eurovea Galleria		2010 (Phase I); 2023 (Phase II)	Largest shopping mall in Slovakia.	

=== Living ===
All six residential buildings housing 1,410 apartments.

Name	Image	Completion year	Number of apartments	Notes	Ref.
Ganz House		2026	65	Under construction	
Eurovea Tower		2023	389	The tallest building in Slovakia.	
Eurovea Riverside		2023	96	Phase II of Eurovea’s promenade apartment building.	
Panorama City Towers		2015	303; 303	Two residential skyscrapers. Between the years 2015–2023, the highest residential buildings in Slovakia.	
Eurovea Apartments		2010	254	Phase I of Eurovea’s promenade apartment building.	

=== Offices ===
Name	Image	Completion year	Office space	Notes	Ref.
Ganz House		2026	10,000 m^{2} (110,000 sq ft)	Under construction	
Pribinova 40		2023	22,123 m^{2} (238,130 sq ft)		
Pribinova 34		2023	18,500 m^{2} (199,000 sq ft)		
Landererova 12		2018	24,000 m^{2} (260,000 sq ft)	Also called Panorama Business III.	
Pribinova 19		2017	28,000 m^{2} (300,000 sq ft)	Also called Panorama Business II.	
Pribinova 4-6-10		2010	24,500 m^{2} (264,000 sq ft)	Also called Eurovea Central 1, 2, 3	
Tower 115		1984	33,400 m^{2} (360,000 sq ft)	The building was renovated in 2008 when it was included in the Eurovea City project.	
Warehouse No. 7		1920s	5,400 m^{2} (58,000 sq ft)	National cultural heritage site.	

=== Leisure ===
Name	Image	Completion year	Notes	Ref.
Eurovea Promenade		2010 (Phase I); 2023 (Phase II)	Danube promenade beside the Eurovea Apartments and the Eurovea Riverside.	
Panorama Park		2016	The park is located in the inner block between the Panorama City Towers, the Pribinova 19 and the Tower 115.	
Sheraton Hotel Bratislava		2010	The 5-star Sheraton Bratislava Hotel.	
M. R. Štefánik Square		2010	Little square surrounded by Slovak National Theatre, Sheraton Hotel and Eurovea Galleria by the river Danube.	
Slovak National Theatre		2007	New building of Slovak National Theatre.	

== See also ==
- JTRE
- Bratislava Riverfront
- Sky Park
- List of tallest buildings in Slovakia
- List of tallest buildings in Bratislava
