= Port of Bratislava =

Port of Bratislava Prístav Bratislava
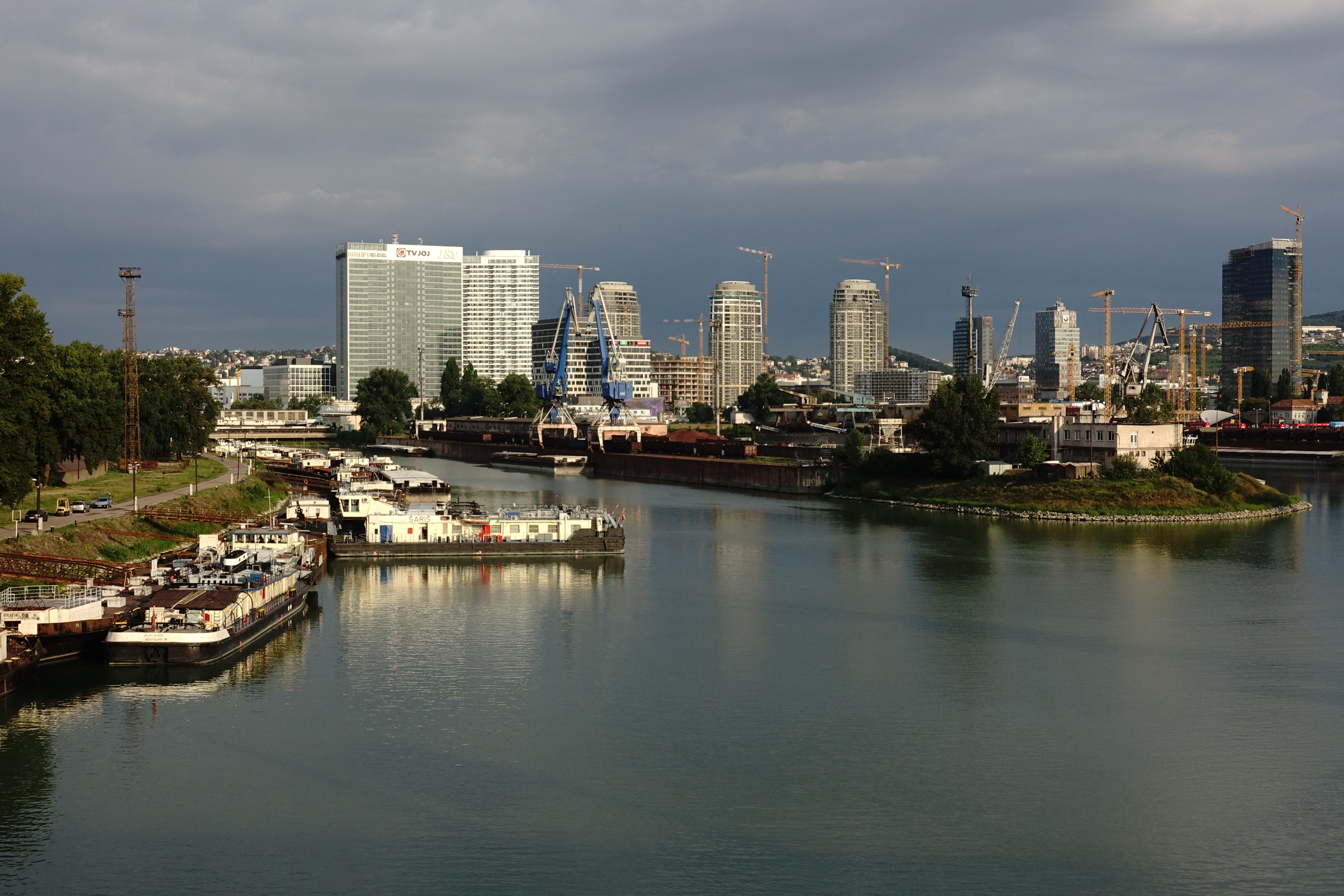
- Winter harbor of the Bratislava cargo port
- Click on the map for a fullscreen view

Location
- Country: Slovakia
- Location: Bratislava, Horárska Street No. 12
- Coordinates: 48°7′50″N 17°8′42″E

Details
- Type of harbour: River port
- Size: Medium

Statistics
- Website www.vpas.sk/en/

The Port of Bratislava (Slovak: Prístav Bratislava) is a major port on the river Danube and — in a wider sense — on the Rhine-Main-Danube waterway, located in Bratislava, the capital of Slovakia. It is a universal inland port consisting of two parts, a cargo port and a passenger port. The former is a key facility for Slovakia's economy as the largest of three international ports in Slovakia, the others being in Komárno and Štúrovo. The port lies at the strategic intersection of the Rhine-Main-Danube Canal with the Baltic-Adriatic Corridor, part of the Trans-European Transport Networks, and it is located near two major ports: Port of Vienna and Port of Budapest.

The port authority for the Port of Bratislava is the company Verejné prístavy, a.s. (Public ports, jsc.) (VP). The port is connected to railway, highway and a pipeline transport system to the Slovnaft refinery. Land underneath the cargo port is owned by the state company Verejné prístavy, a.s., all buildings and objects are owned by Slovenská Plavba a Prístavy, a.s.. The cargo port lies at the left riverbank of the Danube, from river kilometer 1 867,290 until 1862,000. Both adjacent riverbanks belong to the Port of Bratislava.

== History ==
In the last decade of the 19th century the Danube riverbank adjacent to the city center of Bratislava (called Pressburg or Pozsony at that time) underwent major changes. In 1890, a new steel bridge called Franz Joseph Brücke (today the Old bridge of Bratislava) was opened and shortly afterwards the construction of the nearby port began. The area along the riverbank from today's Slovak National Museum headquarters until the today's Apollo bridge was converted to accommodate the mooring of up to 250 cargo ships. These activities were driven mainly by the commercial interests of transport companies on the Danube and the state of Austria-Hungary financially participated only minimally.

The current port area was developed from 1897 with the start of construction on the north pool of the Winter harbor and the establishment and gradual extension of the railway network. It was constructed in the vicinity of the oldest industrial quarter in the city near Továrenská Street. The construction of the south pool started in 1907. The Winter harbour served originally only for the wintering of ships (the water never freezes here) without the possibility to load/unload cargo.

After the dissolution of Austria-Hungary, Czechoslovak transport office was created in 1919 which was the predecessor of the port operator, founded in June 1922 as the Czechoslovak Danube nautical stock company. The complex was finished during the times of the First Czechoslovak Republic and in the 1930s the port was among the best equipped European river establishments.

In 1922, the port operator owned 5 steam tugboats and 44 barges. In 1938 the company owned altogether 167 ships of various function. Today, the fleet counts 221 ships and boats.

Today, numerous historical buildings, machines and ships still remain in the Port of Bratislava including the Warehouse Nr. 14, Warehouse Nr. 17, Warehouse Nr. 7, the Old Boatmen's House and a pumping station (Slovak: budova prečerpávacej stanice) - the last three being protected as national cultural monuments. In 2011, the ship Šturec, the last remaining Slovak river motor tugboat was declared as culturally protected. Šturec (formerly Štúr) was built in the Komárno shipyard in 1937 and it was christened by Prime minister Milan Hodža and the first Slovak maritime ship captain Július Thurzo. It is the only surviving ship from the trio of sister ships Šturec, Vajanský a Moyzes and she survived a sinking when being hit by a bomb during the Allied carpet bombing of the Apollo refinery in 1944. There are plans to turn the ship into a nautical museum.

In the future, the City of Bratislava plans to extend the riverbank promenade to include also the picturesque old Winter harbour, and in the long-term all industrial activity should be moved to areas on the other side of the Harbour bridge. These plans are opposed by the port operator Slovenská Plavba a Prístavy, a.s. (SPaP) which obstructs the declaration of various buildings and structures as cultural monuments and plans to strengthen its operations and does not publicly speak about moving from the Winter harbour.

== Passenger port ==
Port for passengers is located directly in the Bratislava city center between the New bridge and Old bridge at Fajnorovo nábrežie Street No. 2. It consists of a small building and 8 loading platforms. Besides providing port-related services the building features also a few shops, restaurant and a travel agency office. The port is situated on the Danube free flow between river kilometer 1870,00 and 1867,00.

The reconstruction of the passenger port building is in planning for several years but the process was slowed down by local activists as well as the cultural monuments protection office of the municipal government. The height of the proposed reconstruction was lowered several times from the original 5 floors to 3 by the owner and investor Slovenská plavba a prístavy - lodná osobná doprava, a.s. The project aims to expand the building as well as green areas in the vicinity without reducing the size of the adjacent surface parking lot and while expanding the riverbank promenade behind the building. As of 2016 the construction has not started.

== Cargo port ==
The cargo port consists of the following parts:

- Winter harbor (Slovak: Zimný prístav) - the original port from 1897
- Pálenisko - new port built in 1975–1983
- Shipyard (Slovak: Lodenica) - shipyard for ship repairs

== See also ==
- Transport in Bratislava
- Economy of Bratislava
