= Apollo Bridge =

Apollo Bridge Most Apollo
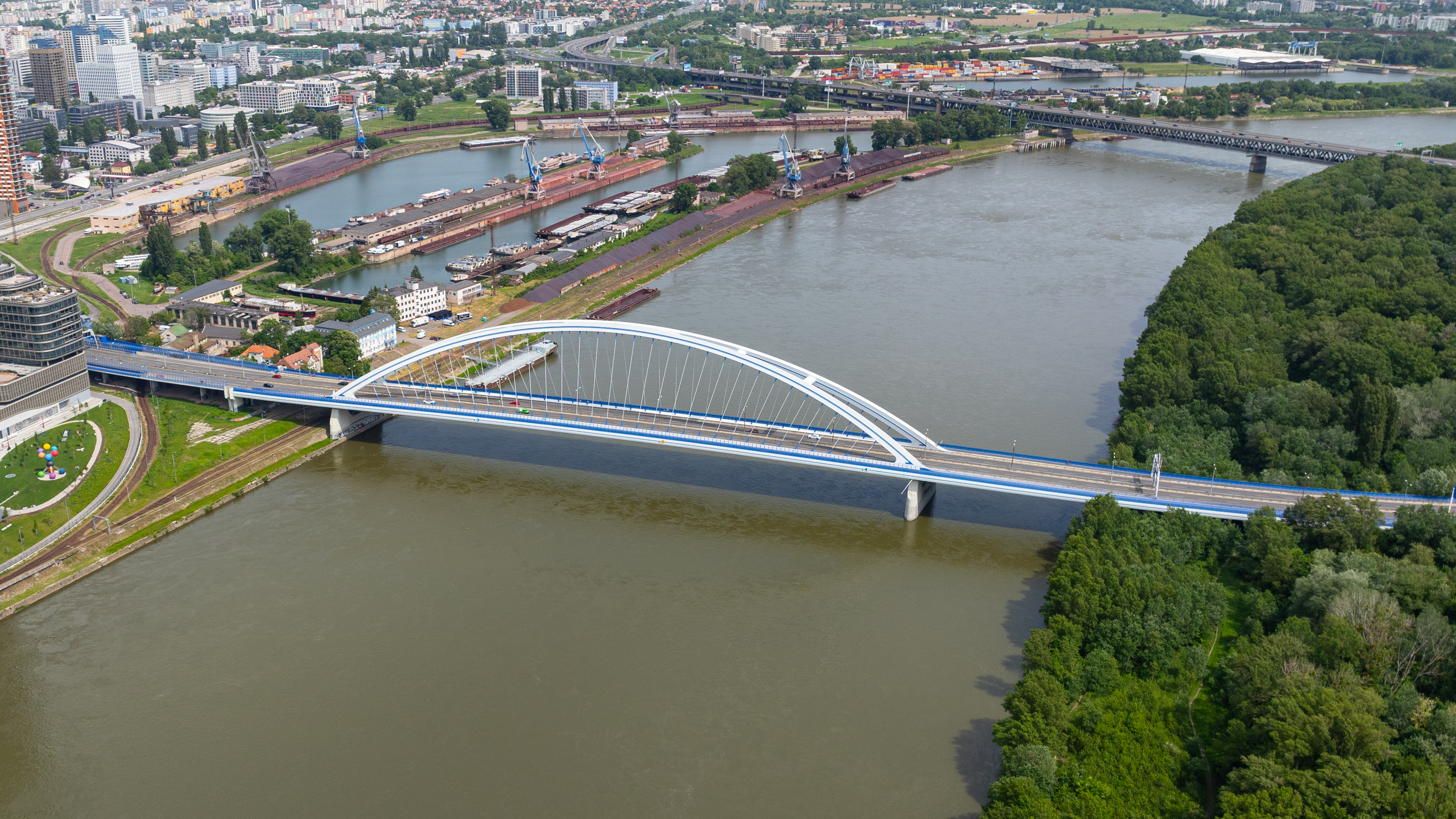
- Apollo Bridge from the Petržalka side
- Coordinates: 48°08′15″N 17°07′41″E
- Carries: 2 vehicle lanes, 2 pedestrian walkways
- Crosses: Danube
- Locale: Bratislava, Slovakia
- Owner: Metro Bratislava a.s.

Characteristics
- Design: Arch
- Total length: 854 m
- Width: 32 m

History
- Designer: Dopravoprojekt a.s.
- Constructed by: Doprastav a.s.
- Opened: September 5, 2005

Location
- Interactive map of Apollo Bridge

Apollo Bridge (Slovak: Most Apollo, German: Apollobrücke), provisionally known as Most Košická during construction after the street leading to it, in Bratislava is a road bridge over the Danube in the capital of Slovakia. It is located between the Starý most and Prístavný most Bridges, a site which allowed almost perpendicular bridging, resulting in the shortest possible span.

Construction of the bridge began in 2003. The bridge was opened to the public on September 5, 2005. It is named for the "Apollo" (modern successor: Slovnaft) oil refinery which was situated on the left river bank in this area before World War II. Its curved lines, inclined arches and virtual absence of right angles make the geometric shape of the bridge very sophisticated. In an unprecedented maneuver, the 5,240-ton steel structure, spanning 231 metres, was rotated across the river from its construction site on the left bank into its final position on a pillar 40 metres from the right bank. The Apollo Bridge was the only European project named one of five finalists for the 2006 Outstanding Civil Engineering Achievement Award (OPAL Award) by the American Society of Civil Engineers.

== Gallery ==
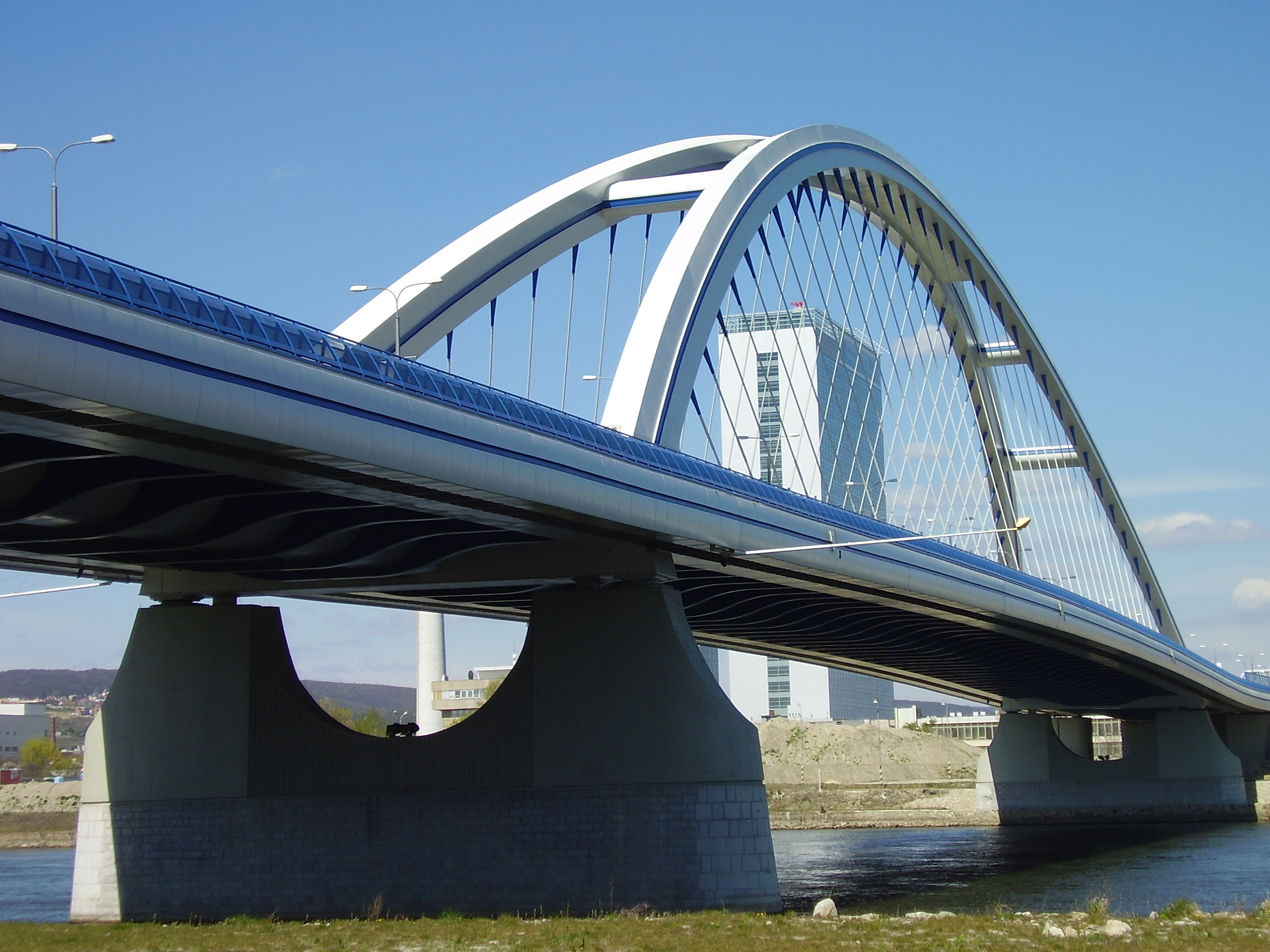
Apollo Bridge

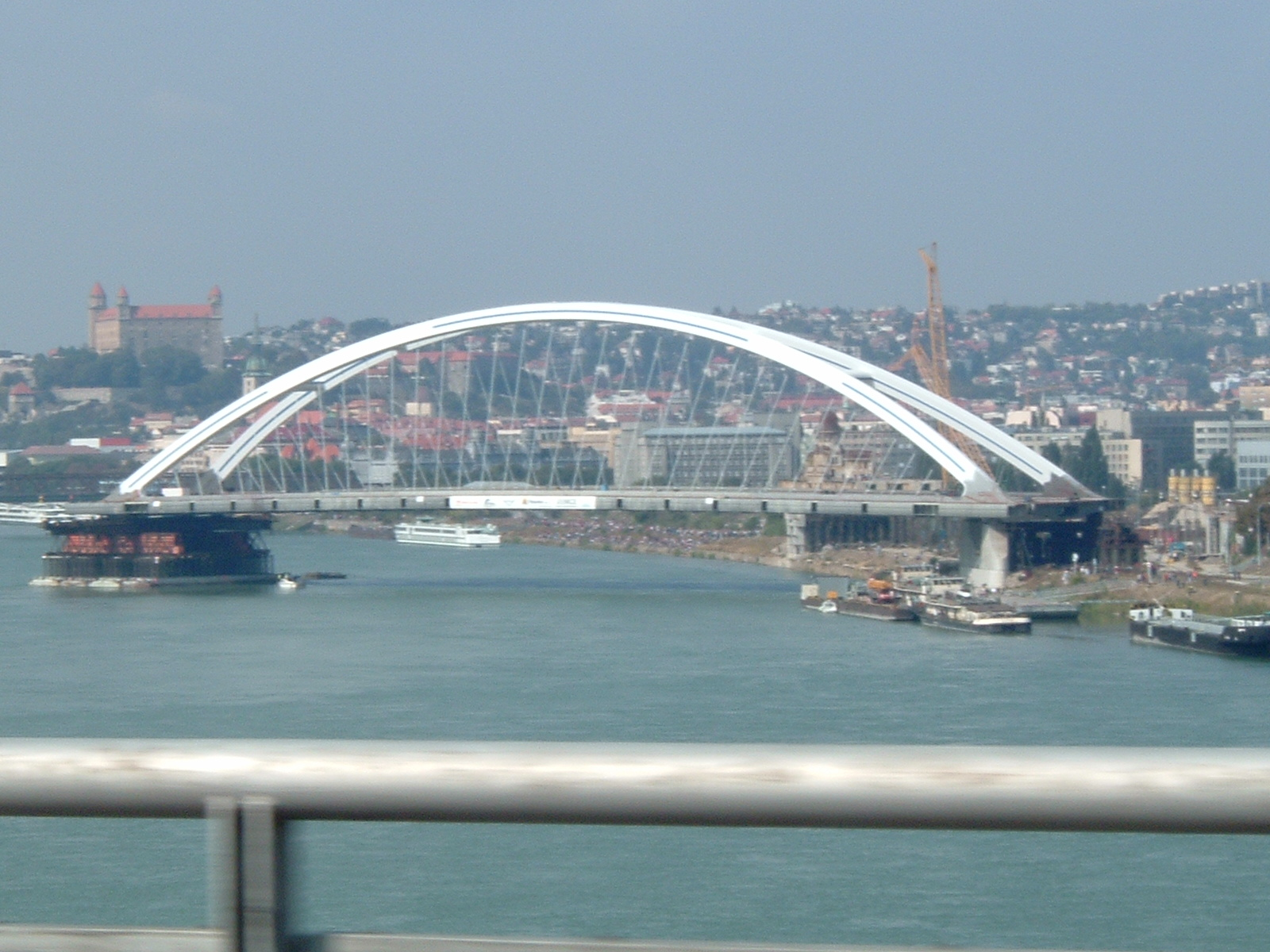
The rotation of the bridge

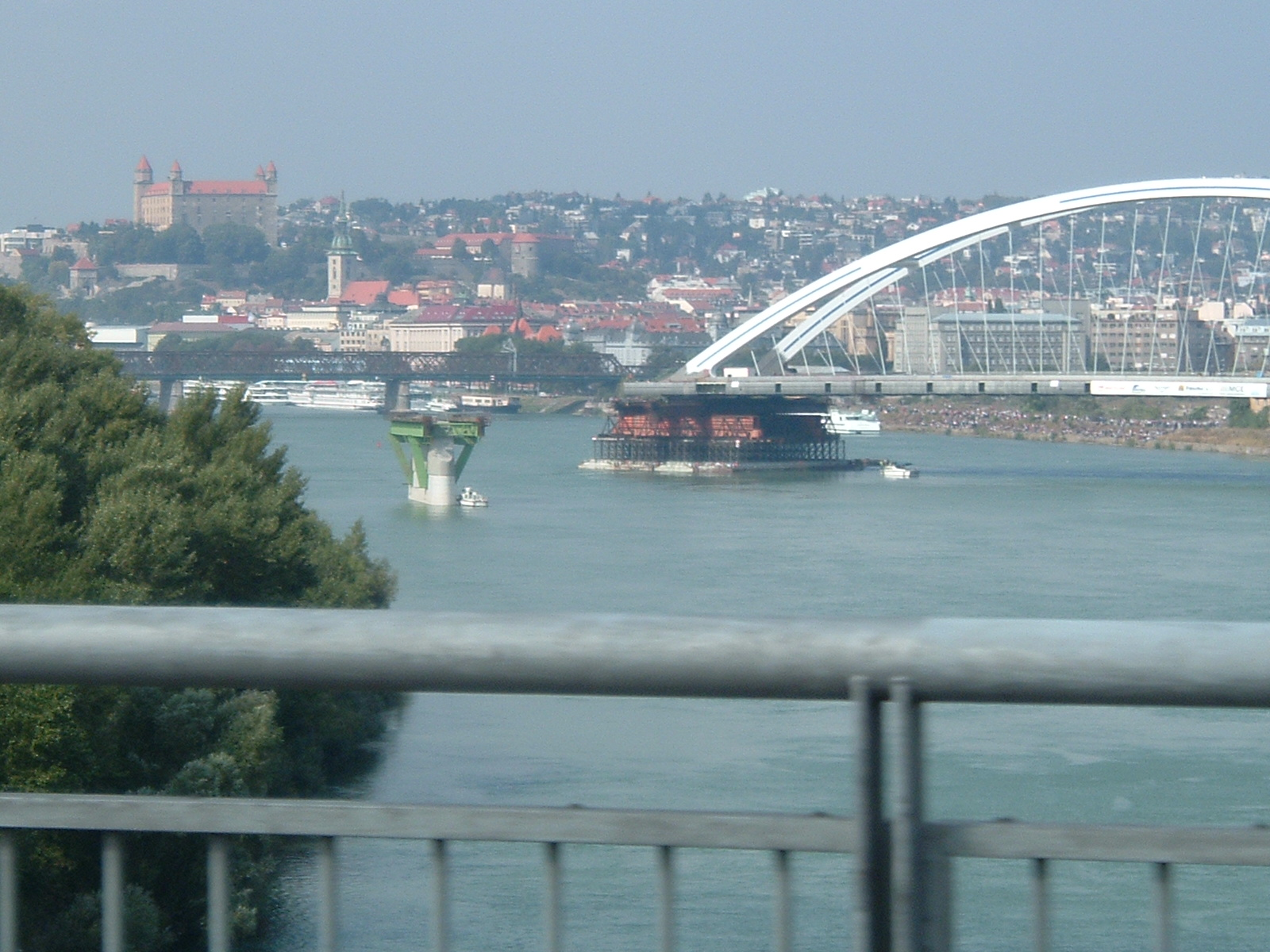
The rotation of the bridge

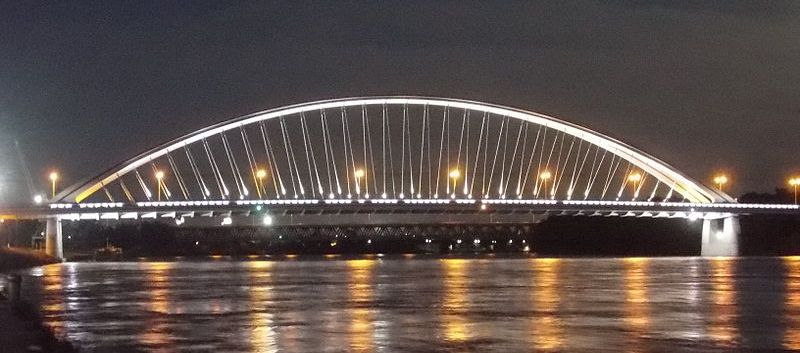
Apollo Bridge at night

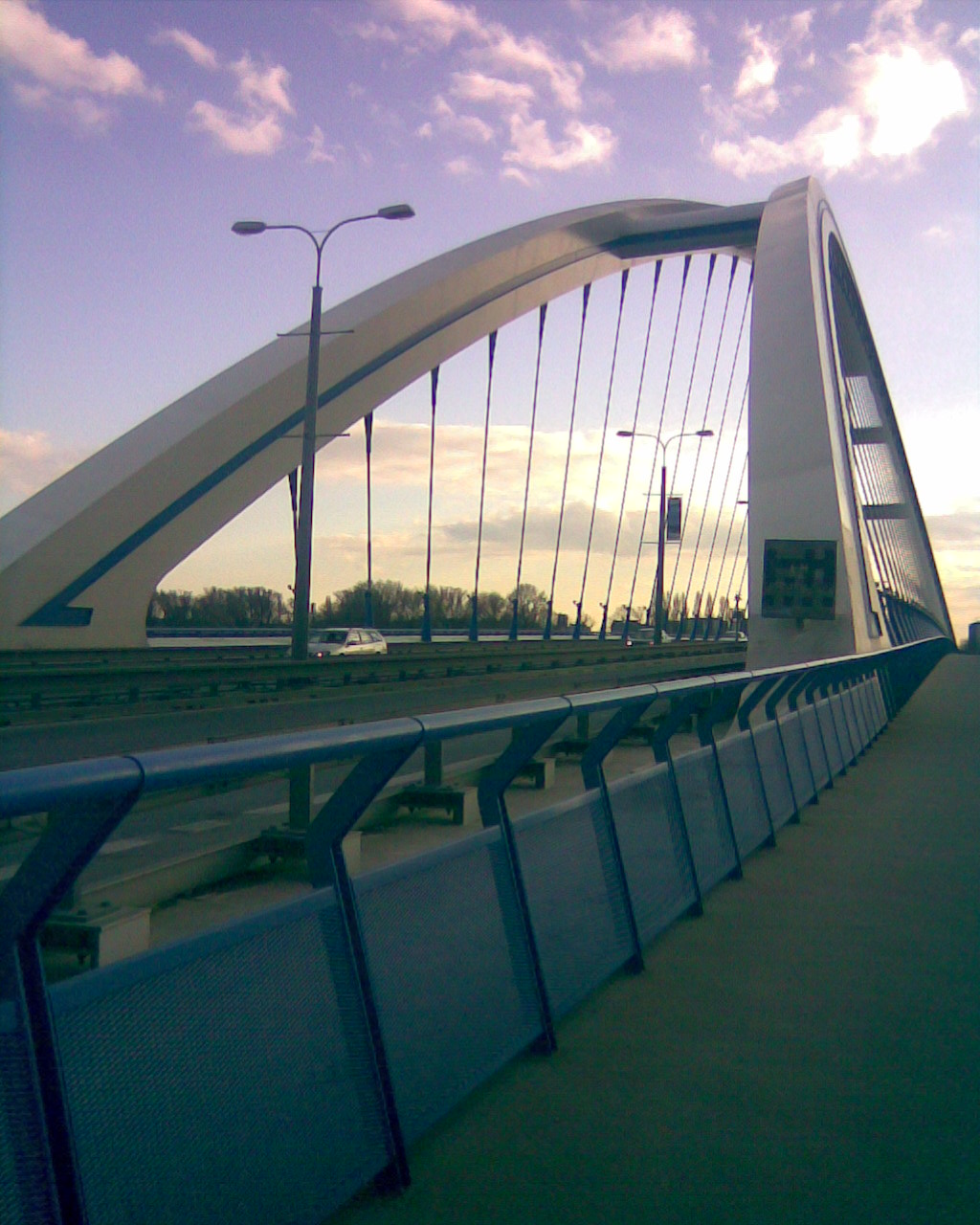

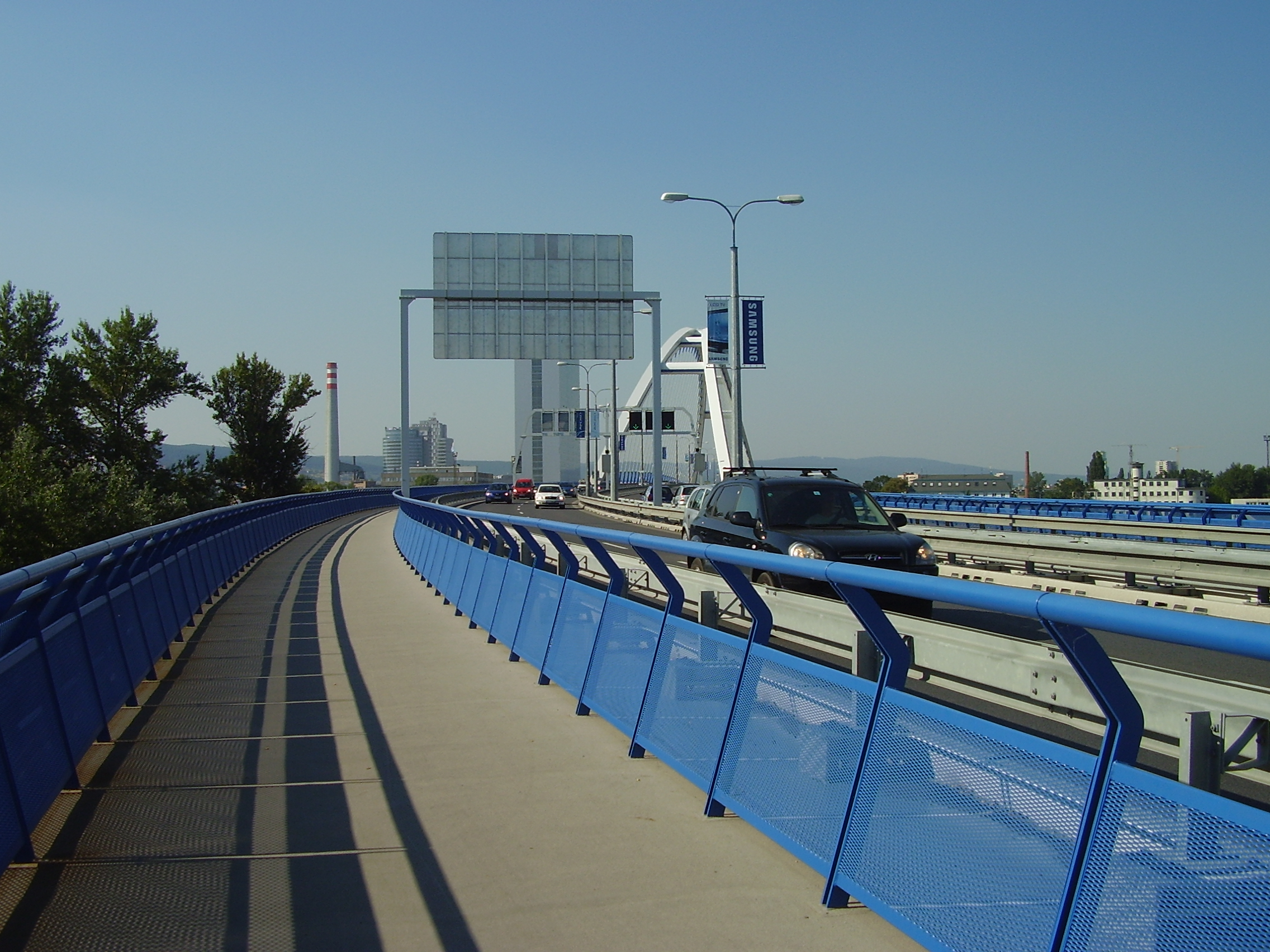
