= Bratislava Riverfront =

Riverfront

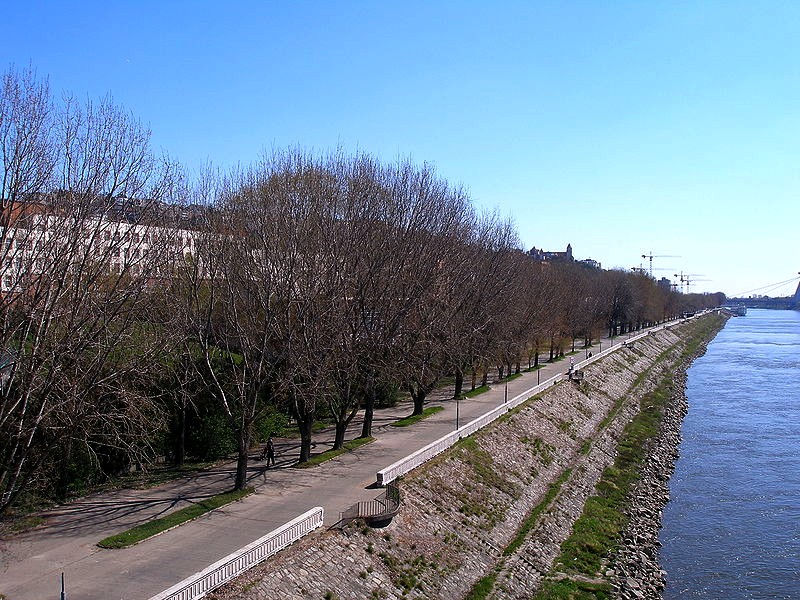
Part of the Bratislava Riverfront as seen from the Lafranconi Bridge.

Bratislava Riverfront (Slovak: Bratislavské nábrežie) is a riverfront on the river Danube located on the Old Town side of Bratislava, Slovakia. It extends from the Karloveská bay near the Lafranconi Bridge to the Port of Bratislava and Harbour Bridge. In the past, the riverfront included the Coronation Hill, where the newly crowned Kings of Hungary would recite an oath and make crosses with their sword in four cardinal directions to show their resolution to defend the country. The hill was demolished in 1870 when the shores of the Danube were strengthened.

Bratislava Riverfront is a tourist attraction as well as a leisure area for the citizens of Bratislava.

== Location and division ==
The riverfront begins near the garden of the Bratislava Water Company in the Karlova Ves borough of Bratislava and runs along the Danube up to the Harbour Bridge. It is divided into four sections.

- From Karloveská bay to the Lafranconi Bridge. Named Nábrežie Ľubomíra Kadnára, it consists partially of a bike path and partially of a narrow dirt road winding through the semi-preserved riparian forests. The area features the Museum of the Bratislava Water Company, the Botanical Garden of the Comenius University and the canalised outlet of the river Vydrica. The area also features a complex of water sports facilities (especially kayaking) with many local sports clubs present here.
- From the Lafranconi Bridge to the Old Bridge. It consists of the streets Dvořákovo nábrežie, Rázusovo nábrežie and Fajnorovo nábrežie and features a broad walkway with benches, tree alleys and statues. The area includes the Faculty of Physical Education and Sports of the Comenius University, the Park kultúry a oddychu, the River Park complex, the Chatam Sofer Memorial, the Bratislava Passenger Port and many monuments of the Old Town of Bratislava.
- From the Old Bridge to the Apollo Bridge. It consists of the Eurovea complex and an empty space waiting for the Eurovea Phase 2 construction to begin. It features two artificial pedestrian piers and the culturally protected building of Warehouse No. 7.
- From the Apollo Bridge up to a few dozen meters behind the Harbour Bridge. Part of the Port of Bratislava, not officially accessible. It is industrial in character and features numerous protected cultural monuments.

== History ==
In 2010, a new anti-flood wall was constructed along parts of the riverbank to protect Bratislava from periodic floods on the river Danube. At the same time, part of the riverbank from the New Bridge to the Passenger Port was reconstructed.

== Gallery ==
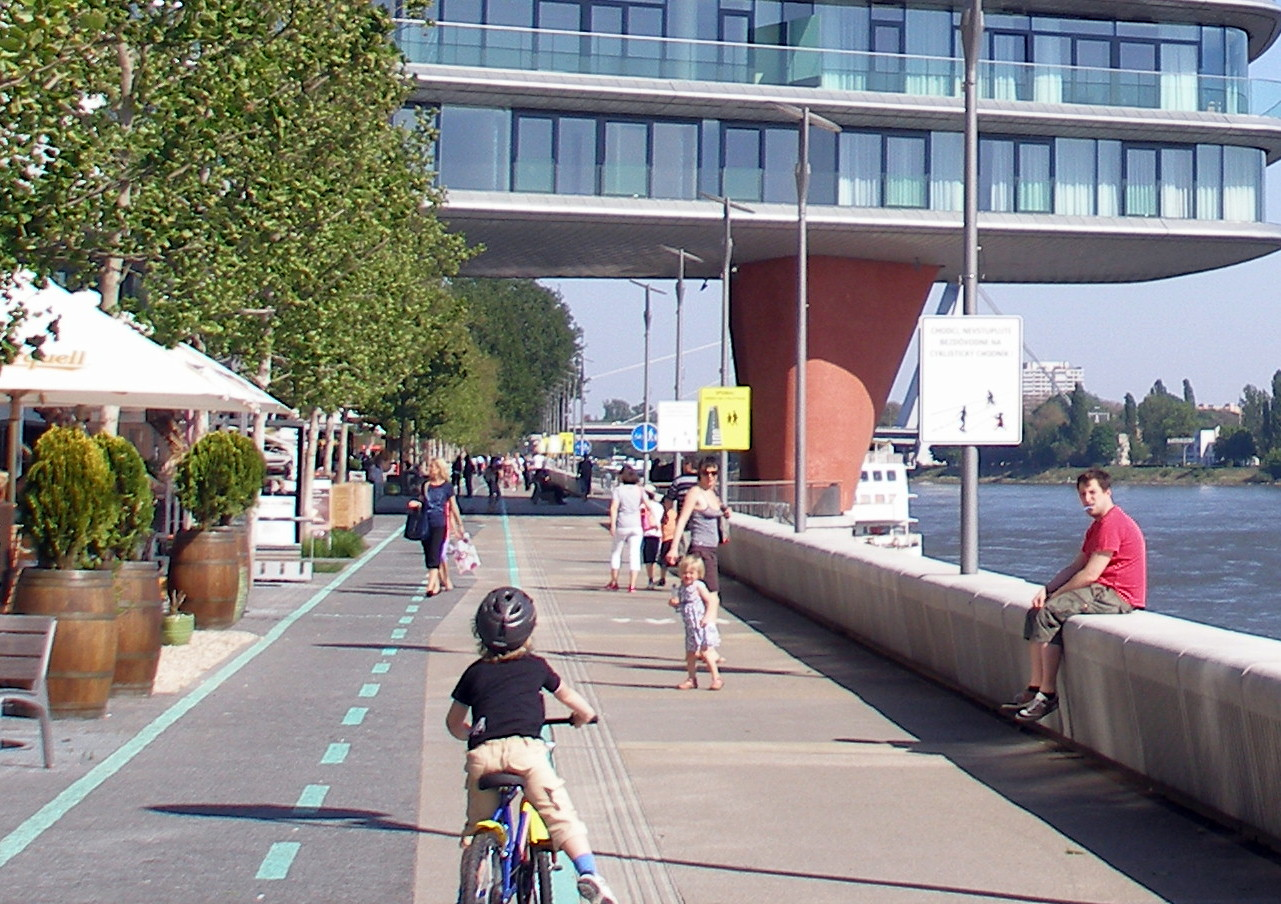
Part of the Bratislava Riverfront in the River Park complex

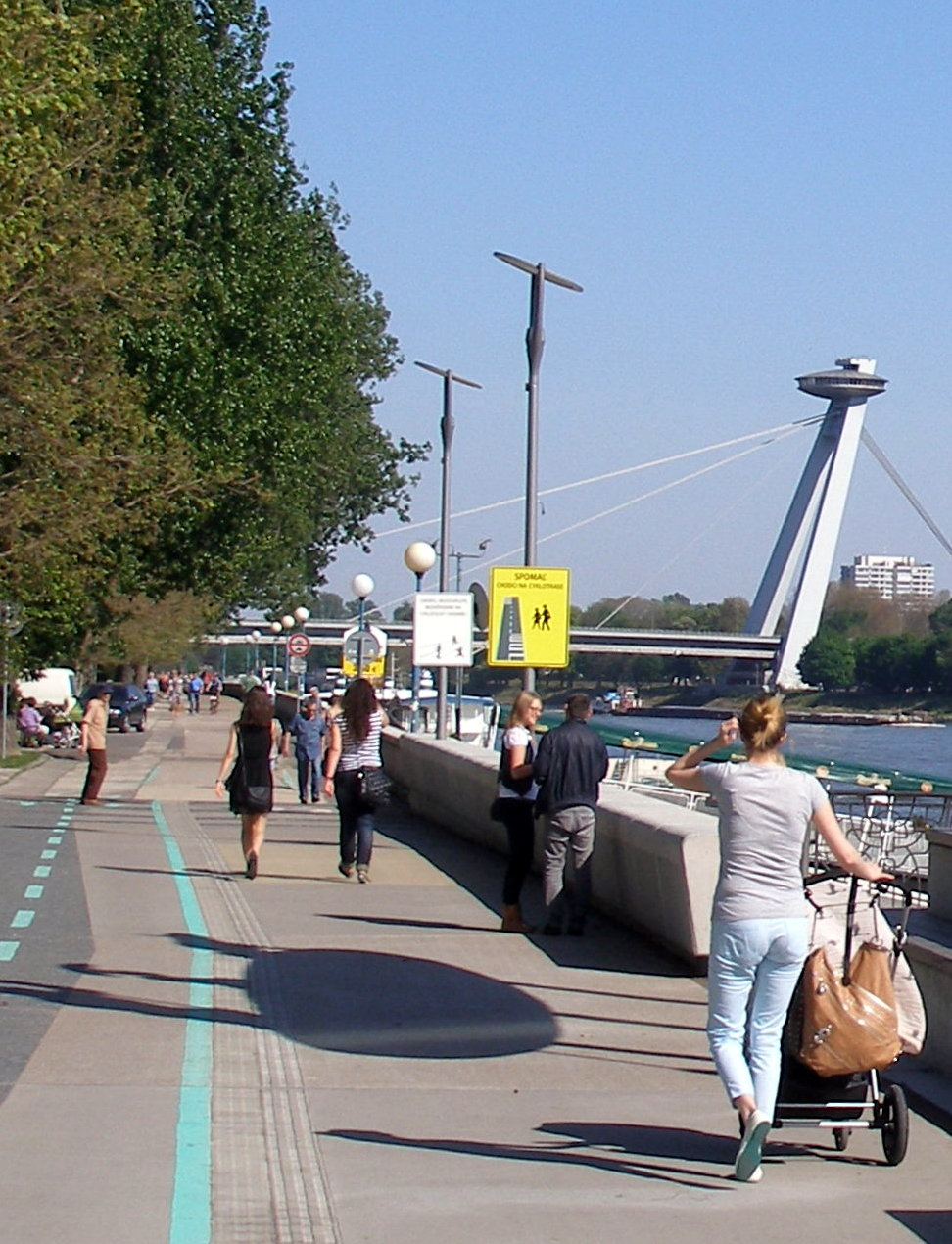
Part of the Bratislava Riverfront near the New Bridge

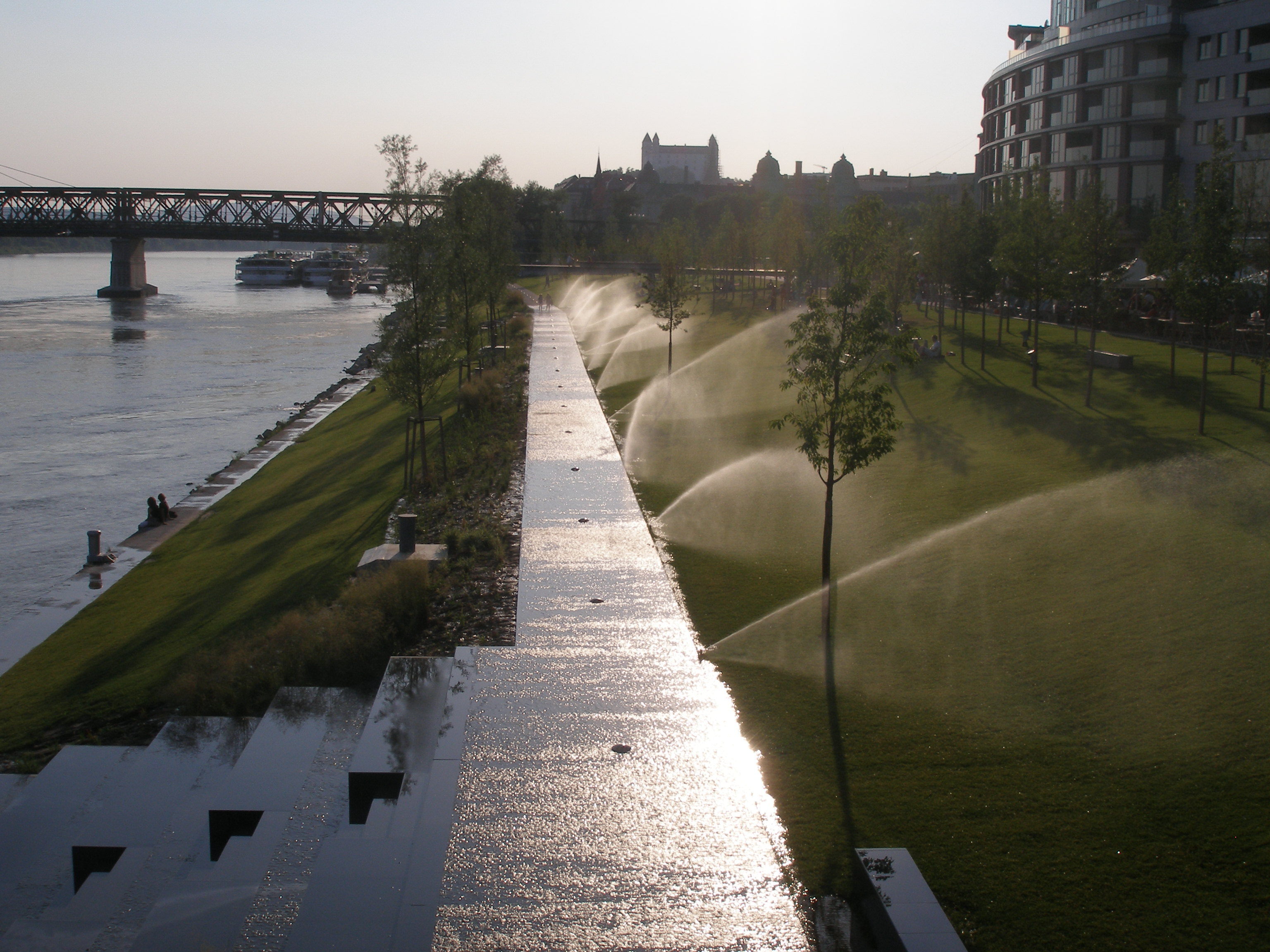
Part of the Bratislava Riverfront in the Eurovea complex

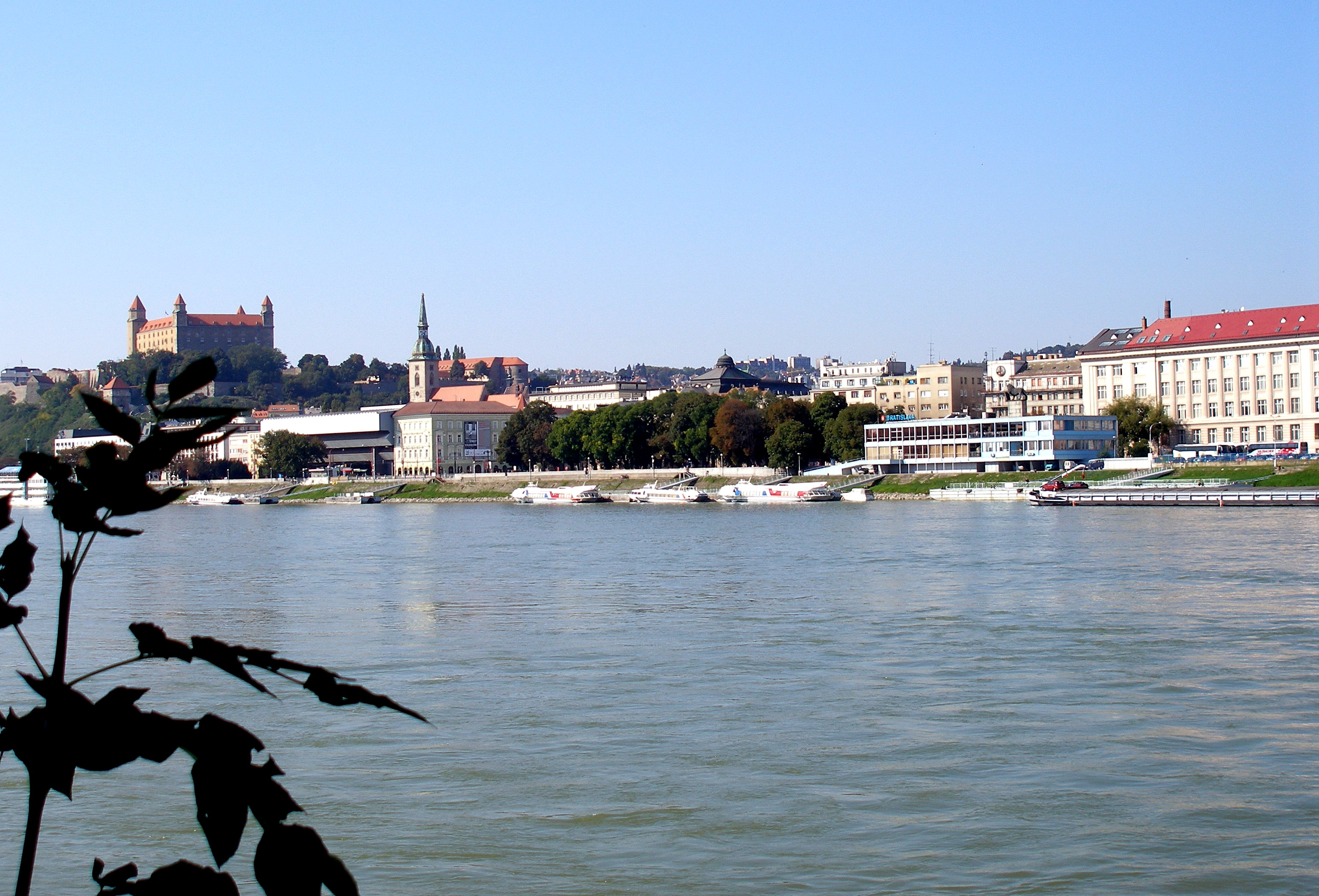
Bratislava Riverfront as seen from Petržalka

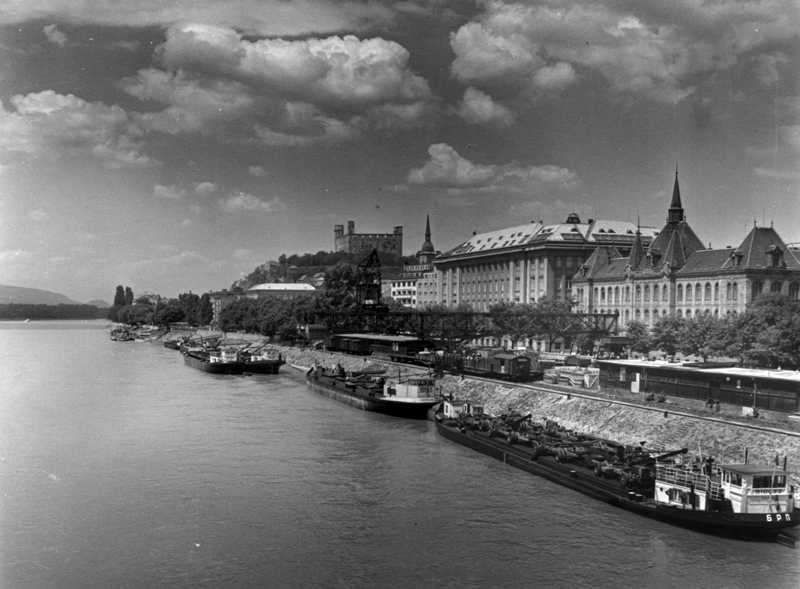
Historical photograph of the riverfront showing its industrial heritage

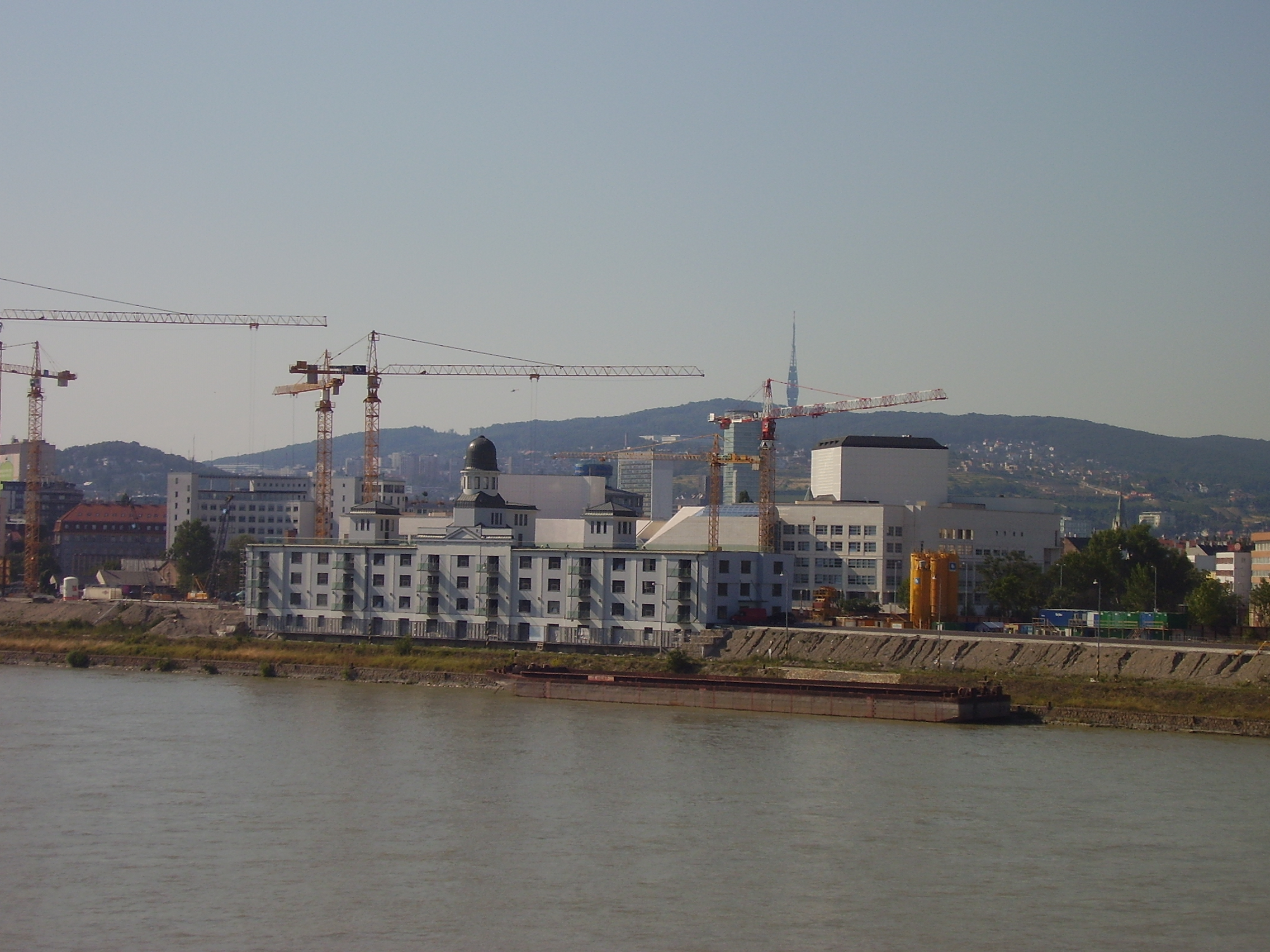
Culturally protected building of Warehouse No. 7

== See also ==
- Geography of Bratislava
- Old Town, Bratislava
