= River Park (Bratislava) =

Multifunction center in Bratislava, Slovakia

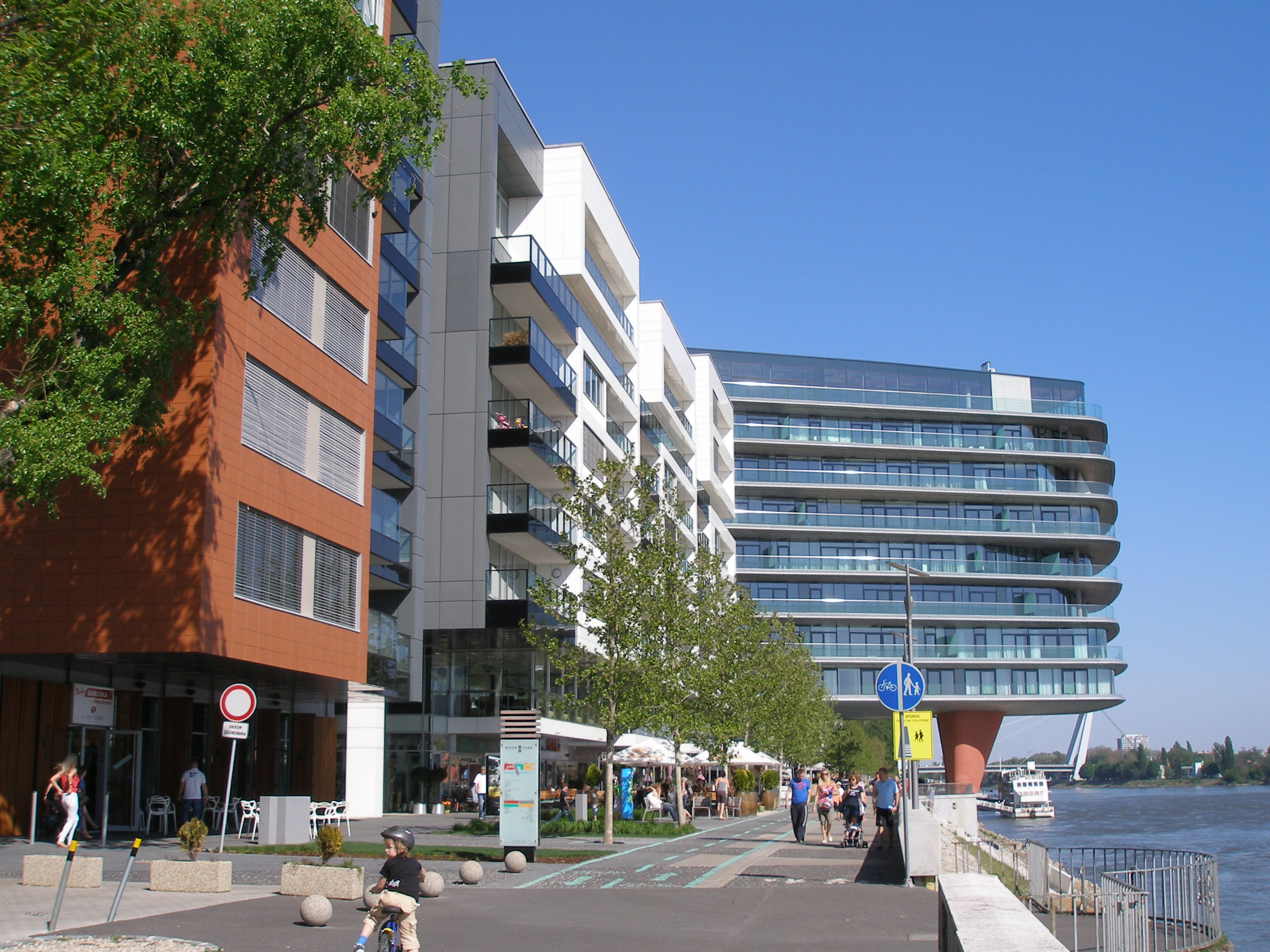
River Park promenade

River Park is a mixed-use development on the river Danube in Old Town, Bratislava. It is a complex of administrative, residential, and commercial buildings developed by JTRE, and it includes the five-star Grand Hotel River Park. River Park also features distinctive restaurants, shops, and a relaxation zone with green areas, alleys, and a promenade.

It is located on the Bratislava Riverfront below the castle hill, between the Chatam Sofer Memorial and the Lanfranconi university dormitories on Nábrežie armádneho generála Ludvíka Svobodu Street. The first phase of River Park was completed in 2010, and the second phase is under construction. Numerous major companies have their headquarters in River Park including 365.bank, KPMG Slovakia, JTRE, J&T Banka, and Sandberg Capital.

== Location ==
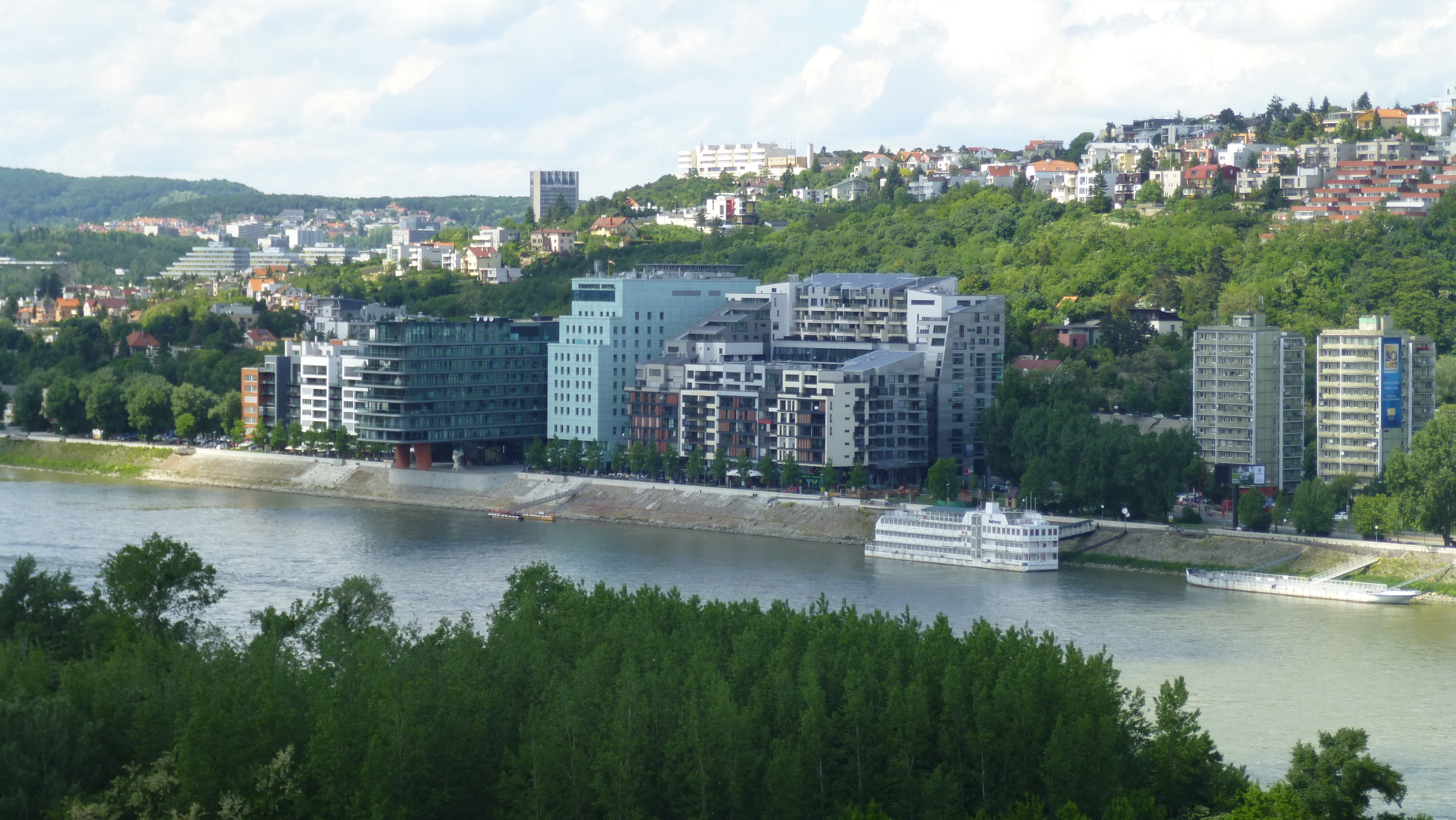
River Park first phase as seen from Petržalka

River Park is located on the left bank of the Danube in Bratislava, between the Zuckermandel complex and the Lanfranconi Student Dormitory at Dvořákovo nábrežie Street numbers 4–10. Its public spaces form part of the Bratislava waterfront.

The first phase covers an area of more than 2.5 hectares, and the second phase is being prepared for construction. The location of River Park ensures accessibility from all parts of the city, as well as direct connections via the city ring road and highway to Vienna, Budapest, Prague, and the rest of Slovakia. Public transport in the form of trams and buses serves River Park through the Kráľovské údolie and Chatam Sofer stops.

== Division ==
The architecture of River Park is based on the concept of Dutch architect Erick van Egeraat. The main visual landmark of the first phase of the complex is the River House building, which extends with its upper floors over the flow of the Danube. The general designer of the first phase is the architectural studio Bouda Masár architekti. The dominant feature of the second phase will be, upon completion, a new public square. The developers of the project are JTRE and Cresco Group, while the architects of the second phase of River Park are GFI and Bogle Architects.

The location has a distinctly linear character, defined by its position between the river flow and a busy urban road. This character is further reinforced by the morphological segmentation of the terrain, which rises steeply just beyond the road.

=== River Park first phase ===
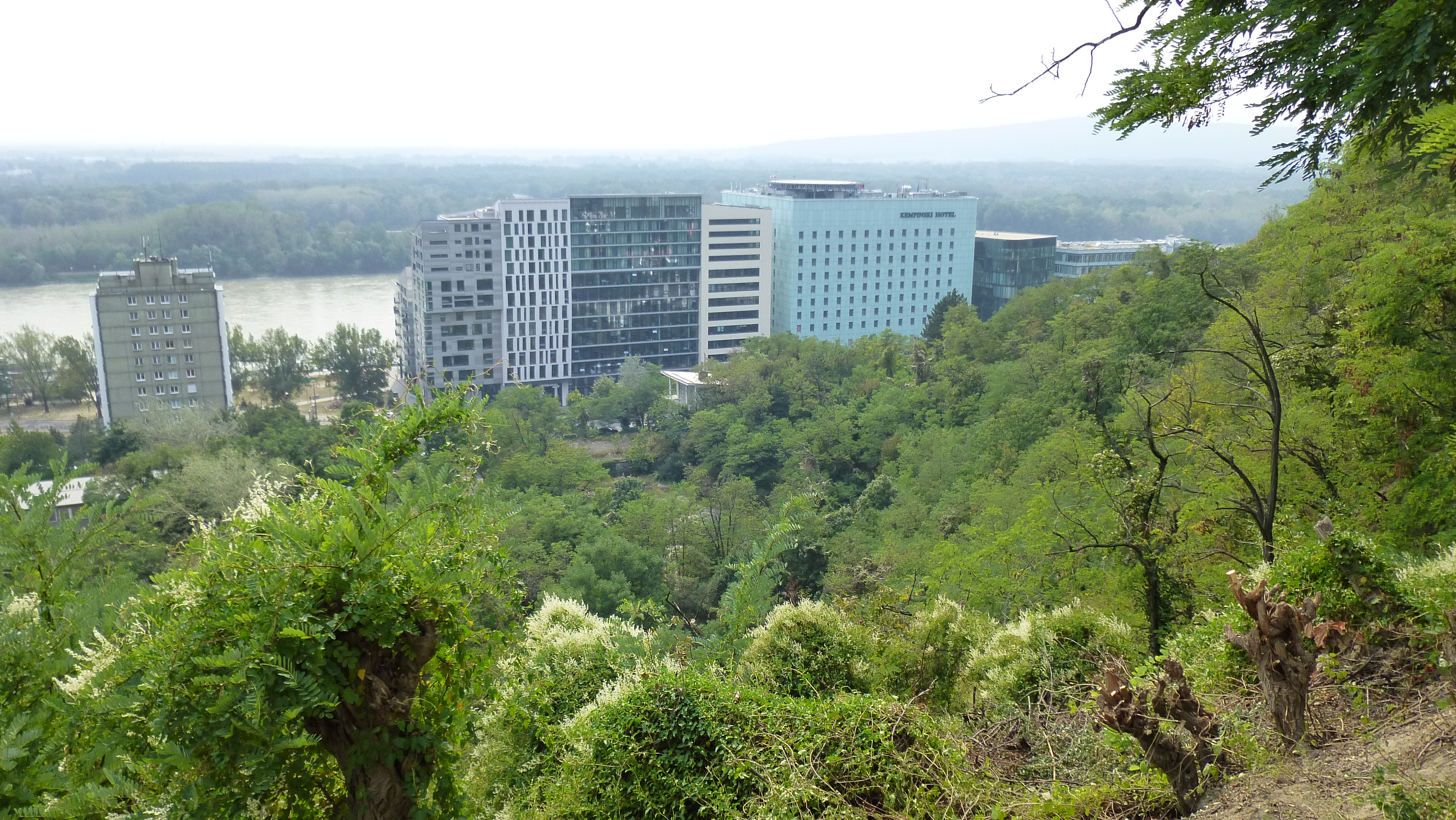
River Park first phase

The first phase of the complex, closer to the city center, consists of four blocks with over 200 luxury flats and apartments and more than 1,100 parking spaces, 400 of which are reserved exclusively for River Park residents. In addition to parking, the underground section houses the technical equipment of the entire complex of buildings. The underground section, consisting of three floors with total floor plan dimensions of 264 × 53 m, is shared by all four blocks and divided into three expansion units. The buildings are founded on piles with diameters of 900 mm and 1,200 mm anchored into the bedrock.

Block 1 contains apartments, shops, and offices, located in the western part of the complex, closer to the Lanfranconi Bridge. The ground floor hosts civic amenities, restaurants and services.

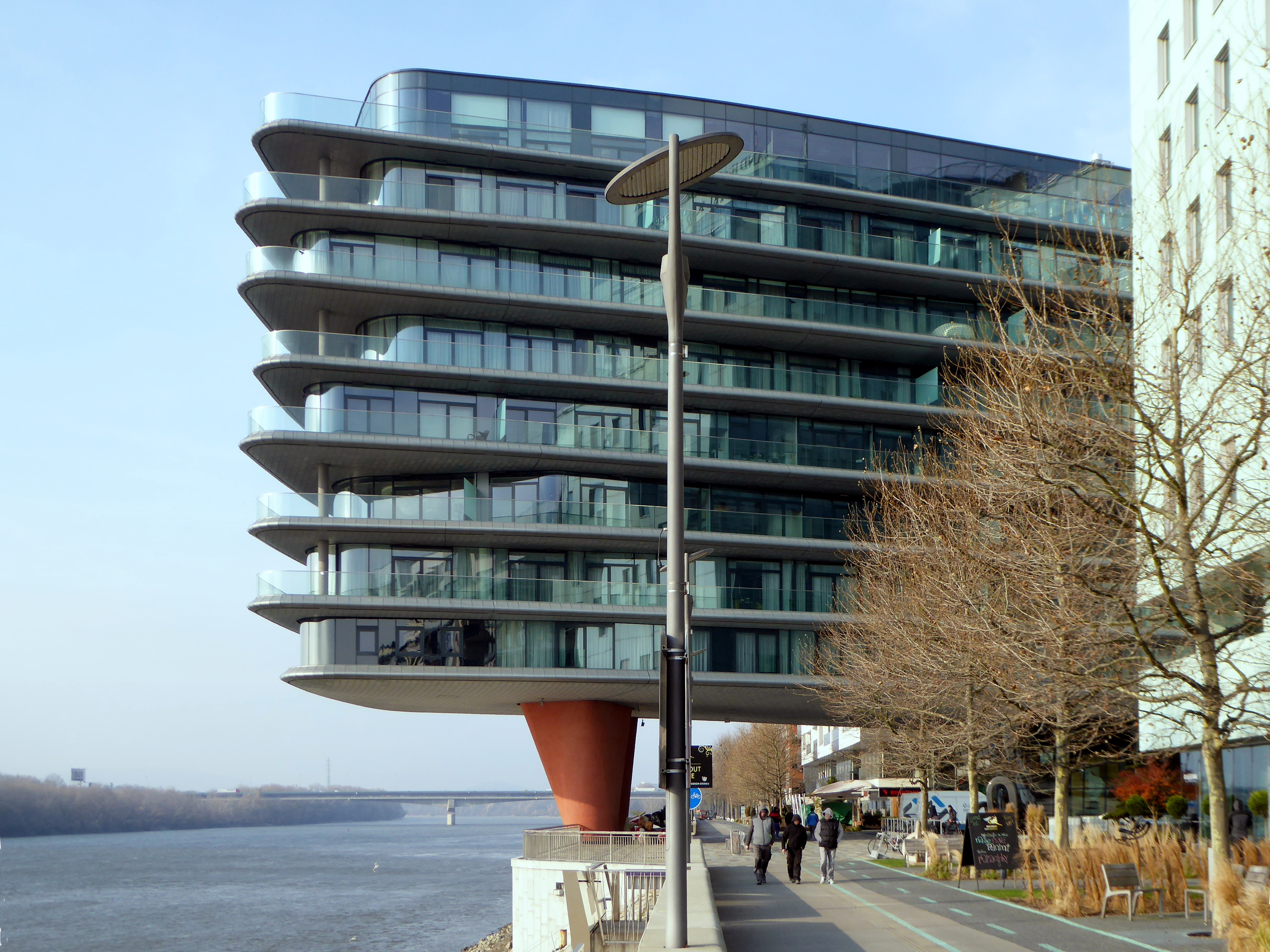
River House

River House (Block 2), with its structure extending over the promenade and the surface of the Danube, it forms the main landmark of the complex. It is one of the most luxurious contemporary buildings in Bratislava. Southern part of River House accommodates apartments, while its northern section contains offices. The building has an irregular trapezoidal floor plan with rounded edges. Its total floor plan dimensions are 104 × 24 m, and it consists of nine above-ground and three underground floors. The load-bearing structure of the building fulfills the architect’s ambitious intention to create a bridge over the promenade of the complex and place apartments directly above the river. This was made possible by the application of prestressing technology, which in Slovakia is typically used only in bridge construction.

Grand Hotel River Park (Block 3), in an L-shaped floor plan, together with River House defines the unofficial square of the complex. The five-star Grand Hotel River Park offers accommodation, conference halls, restaurants, bars, a relaxation area called Zion Spa with pools, a gym, and wellness facilities. The hotel includes the Riverbank Restaurant, led by chef Jaroslav Žídek. Until 2015, the hotel was part of the international Kempinski chain under the name Kempinski Hotel River Park, and it currently belongs to Marriott International, the world’s largest network of luxury hotels. The building has 11 above-ground floors and a commercial heliport on its roof.

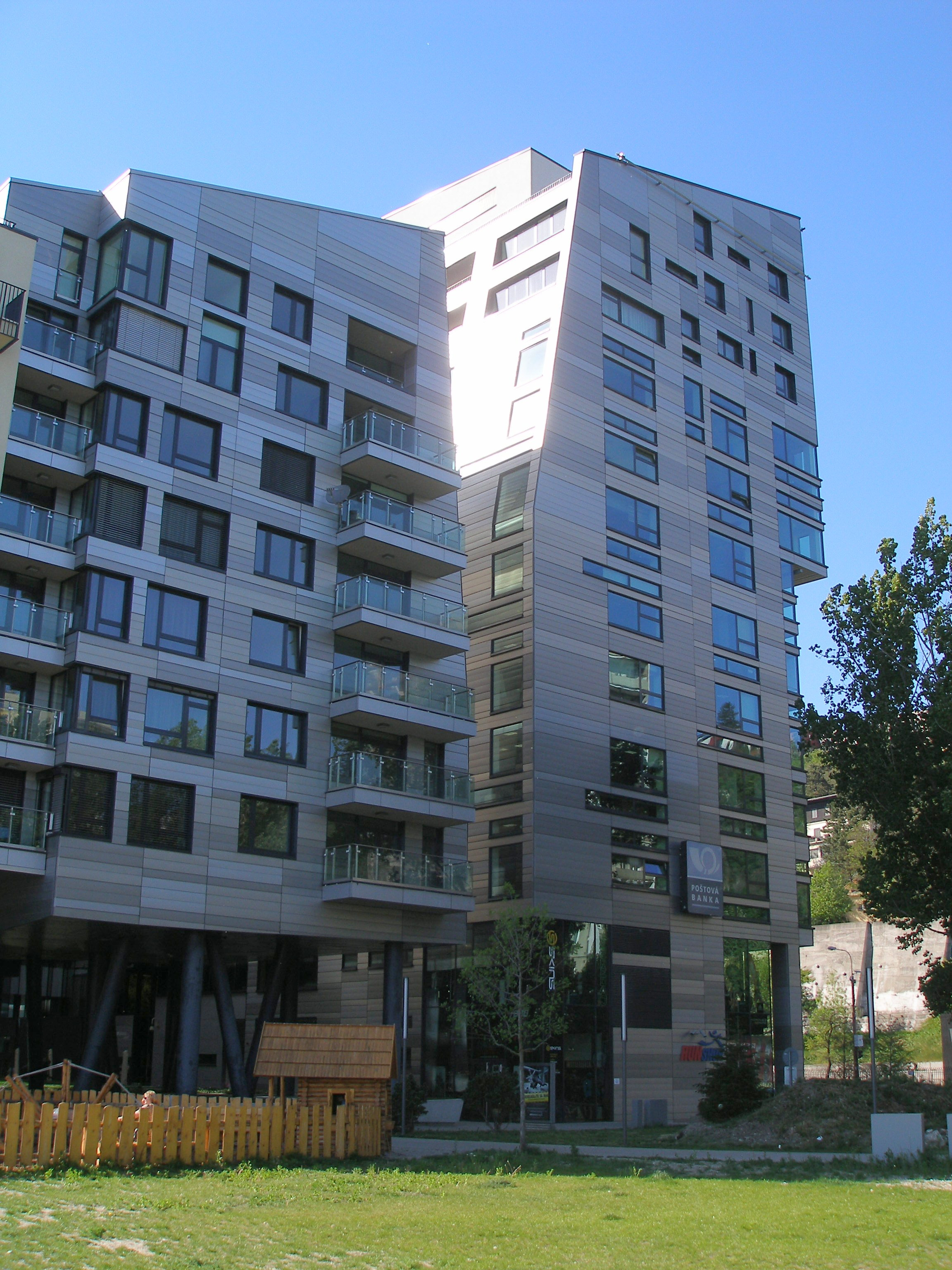
River Park first phase Block 4

Block 4 is the largest block in the eastern part of the complex, closest to the city center. This block also contains apartments with southern orientation and views of the Danube, as well as office spaces facing north. The ground floor hosts civic amenities, restaurants and services.

=== River Park second phase ===
The development was introduced in 2017 on the site of the former Park of Culture and Recreation (Park kultúry a oddychu). The estimated construction costs amount to €100 million.

The originally planned planetarium, called Danube Drop (Dunajská kvapka), as well as the underground garage beneath it, were removed from the project following an agreement with the city. Instead, it will be replaced by a public square with a park and landscaped paved areas with greenery, complemented by partial roofing and two pavilions. The new central space, Lanfranconi Square, will feature large green islands supplemented with curved pathways covered by the partial roofing. The single-story pavilions, oriented toward the riverside promenade, will be built with a light external shell of frameless glass construction in a pentagonal floor plan with rounded corners. The pavilions, with small sanitary facilities, will serve as spaces for pop-up shops and retail, exhibitions, relaxation, cultural activities, reading areas, and more. The design of Lanfranconi Square is the result of an architectural design competition won by the Between architectural studio. The riverfront promenade will be designed as a shared space for cyclists and pedestrians.

== Apartments ==
All residential units in River Park are located in the southern part of the complex facing the Danube. As of now, River Park includes a total of 203 residences, with an additional 448 housing units planned in the second phase. The selling prices of apartments in the first phase of River Park ranged approximately from €2,000 to €4,300 per square metres. The size of individual apartments ranges from 78 square metres up to 535 square metres, with each unit in the complex including a balcony or loggia.

== Services ==
Each apartment is equipped with high-speed internet access and cable television. Available services include property maintenance, 24/7 monitored underground parking facilities, room service and private security. Residents can also use the nearby hotel restaurant with full services, hotel lounges and bars, and the hotel’s Zion Spa. Additional services are provided, such as Airport Shuttle service, cleaning services, laundry and dry-cleaning, delivery service, washing room and more.

River Park also features a variety of amenities, including a grocery store, shops, a spa, showrooms, a pharmacy, and a bookstore. It is home to the Riverpark Dance School and Viktoria’s Gallery of modern art, where the exhibited works are also available for purchase.

== Public spaces ==
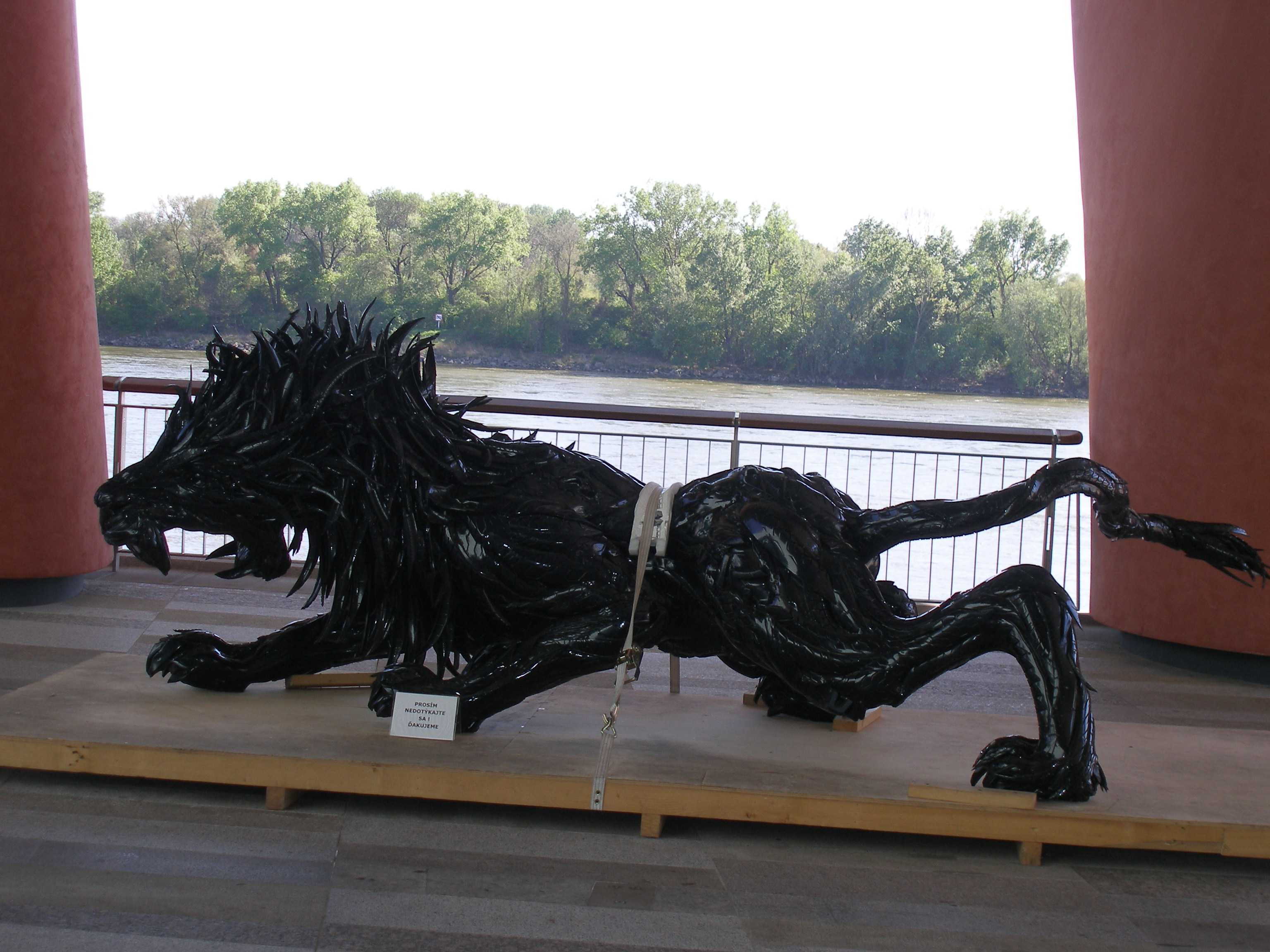
Lion IV by Yong Ho Ji

The River Park complex includes a riverside promenade along the Danube. Between the River House building and the hotel, a smaller square was created, dominated by the walk-through fountain Water Jets. In winter, this area traditionally hosts a children’s ice rink, while all year round it offers the multifunctional children’s playground River parčík. The public also has access to a small architectural feature — steps leading down to the Danube riverbank. All other public spaces in River Park are barrier-free.

Several permanent works of art are located in River Park’s public space. Among the most notable are Lion IV, a sculpture by Korean artist Yong Ho Ji, made of used tires and steel, and Mythical Ship, a sculpture by Czech artist Jaroslav Róna, symbolizing the interweaving of cultures of the region.
