= Chatam Sofer Memorial =

Cemetery in Bratislava, Slovakia

- Mauzóleum Chatama Sófera
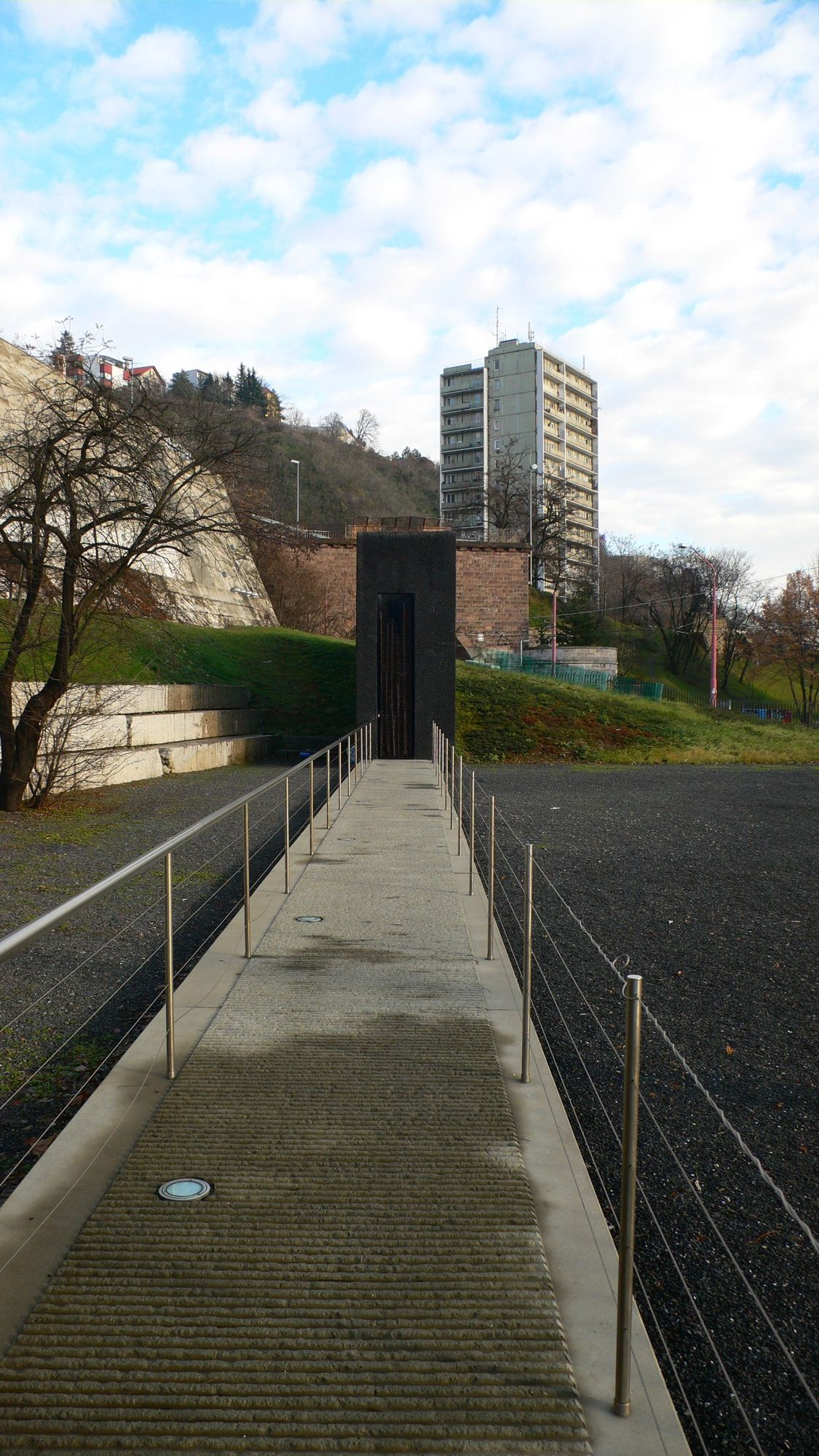
- Chatam Sofer Memorial complex in Bratislava, Slovakia
- Interactive map of Chatam Sofer Memorial
- Location: Nábrežie armádneho generála Ludvíka Svobodu Street (Official Website: http://www.chatamsofer.sk/)
- Coordinates: 48.1418°N 17.0918°E
- Designer: Martin Kvasnica
- Completion date: 2002
- Opening date: July 8, 2002
- Dedicated to: Moses Sofer

Old Jewish Cemetery
- Interactive map of Old Jewish Cemetery

Details
- Established: 17th century
- Location: Nábrežie armádneho generála Ludvíka Svobodu Street, Bratislava
- Country: Slovakia
- Type: mostly demolished in 1943

Chatam Sofer Memorial, formerly the Old Jewish Cemetery is the burial place and memorial of Moses Sofer, a prominent orthodox rabbi from the 19th century, built on the site of a 17th-century Jewish cemetery in Bratislava, Slovakia. The historical cemetery was mostly destroyed with the construction of the road tunnel under Bratislava Castle in 1943 but negotiations with the clero-fascist Slovak leader Jozef Tiso allowed an important fraction of the cemetery containing the graves of the rabbis to be preserved encased in concrete. Later, when the tunnel was converted for public transport trams a tram stop was constructed above the site. In 2002 a modern memorial was erected above the site and it was partially opened to the public.

== Location ==
The fenced area of the Chatam Sofer Memorial is roughly equivalent to the area of the former Old Jewish Cemetery of Bratislava. It is located at Nábrežie armádneho generála Ludvíka Svobodu Street and it is bordered by the tram tunnel to the east, a wall to the north, and the River Park development to the south across the street. It is approximately 70 meters distant from the river Danube.

There is a public transport bus stop (one in each direction) and a tram stop (also one in each direction) called Chatam Sofer next to the memorial.

== Old Jewish Cemetery in Bratislava ==
In the 17th century, Jews were allowed to settle in the area below Bratislava Castle on the estates of the Counts of the Pálffy family. The Jewish community established a graveyard near the river Danube which served until 1847. Since then, the Jewish community has used the Orthodox and Neolog cemetery located on Žižkova Street nearby. Until the mid-20th century the area was immediately adjacent to the Danube, set apart from any houses and quiet as traffic for Bratislava Castle and the city traversed Žižkova Street and other roads above the site. In the 1940s, new structures were erected nearby to serve the International Danube Fair, later to become Park kultúry a oddychu. At the same time, the riverbank was extended and the area filled with roads and tram lines and construction of the tunnel under the Bratislava Castle Hill commenced.

The Old Jewish Cemetery continued to be well maintained until 1942-1943, when it was confiscated by the Slovak State and its anti-Semitic clero-fascist leader Catholic priest Jozef Tiso in 1943 to build a roadway and the cemetery was largely demolished. Most of the graves were exhumed and reburied at the Orthodox cemetery in a communal grave behind the beit tahara. Only the most precious section, where famous Bratislava rabbis were buried – 23 graves surrounding the Chatam Sofer's tomb – was preserved on the original site; members of the Jewish community helped to renovate the burial grounds of the Chatam Sofer after the war. Negotiations with the regime enabled the community to preserve this section of the cemetery including the Chasam Sofer's grave, enclosed in concrete, below the surface of the new road. Several explanations have been offered for the regime's compliance with the community's desires, One says it as a consequence of a large bribe while others cite foreign pressure or for fear of a curse if the graves were destroyed.

This construction allowed the area of the cemetery to become one of the main access points to the Bratislava city center and today, the memorial is seen daily by thousands inside public transport buses and trams passing by. Until the 2000s, the area was separated from the Danube by a public park. The Bratislava City Magistrate and Mayor of Bratislava Andrej Ďurkovský sold this land to the company Henbury Development, which constructed the River Park development a few meters away from the site.

Following the declaration of independence by Slovakia in 1992, new negotiations were undertaken to restore public access to the preserved graves. In the mid-1990s, the International Committee for Preservation of Gravesites of Geonai Pressburg was formed to support and oversee relocation of tram tracks and construction of a mausoleum. In 1999, the Mayor of Bratislava, Jozef Moravčík, Chairman of the Committee Romi Cohn and Chairman of the Bratislava Jewish Religious Community Peter Salner signed a Memorandum of Understanding to allow access to the site.

The architect of the new Chatam Sofer Memorial was Slovak Martin Kvasnica and the construction was undertaken by the company Raft. Construction of the mausoleum was completed after overcoming numerous technical, financial and religious issues and it opened on July 8, 2002.

== Access ==
Since 2002, the site is accessible to the public with restrictions. All visits must be arranged through the local Jewish Community at least 48 hours in advance and visitors must be accompanied by a local guide at all times. There is an entrance fee of $6 per visitor, with an additional $20 for access outside of normal operating hours. There is also a strict protocol and dress code to be adhered to including long trousers, hats for men and covered arms for women. Although in theory the site is accessible also to the citizens of Bratislava, in reality the Memorial is visited almost exclusively by foreign Jewish visitors, becoming an important pilgrimage site.

In 2020, a building adjacent to the Memorial was purchased to serve as a hospitality facility, welcoming guests coming to visit the Chatam Sofer's grave and other Jewish sites in Bratislava. Hot and cold refreshments are usually available, as well as bathrooms. The facility will eventually host a shul, mikvah, and other amenities.

== Gallery ==
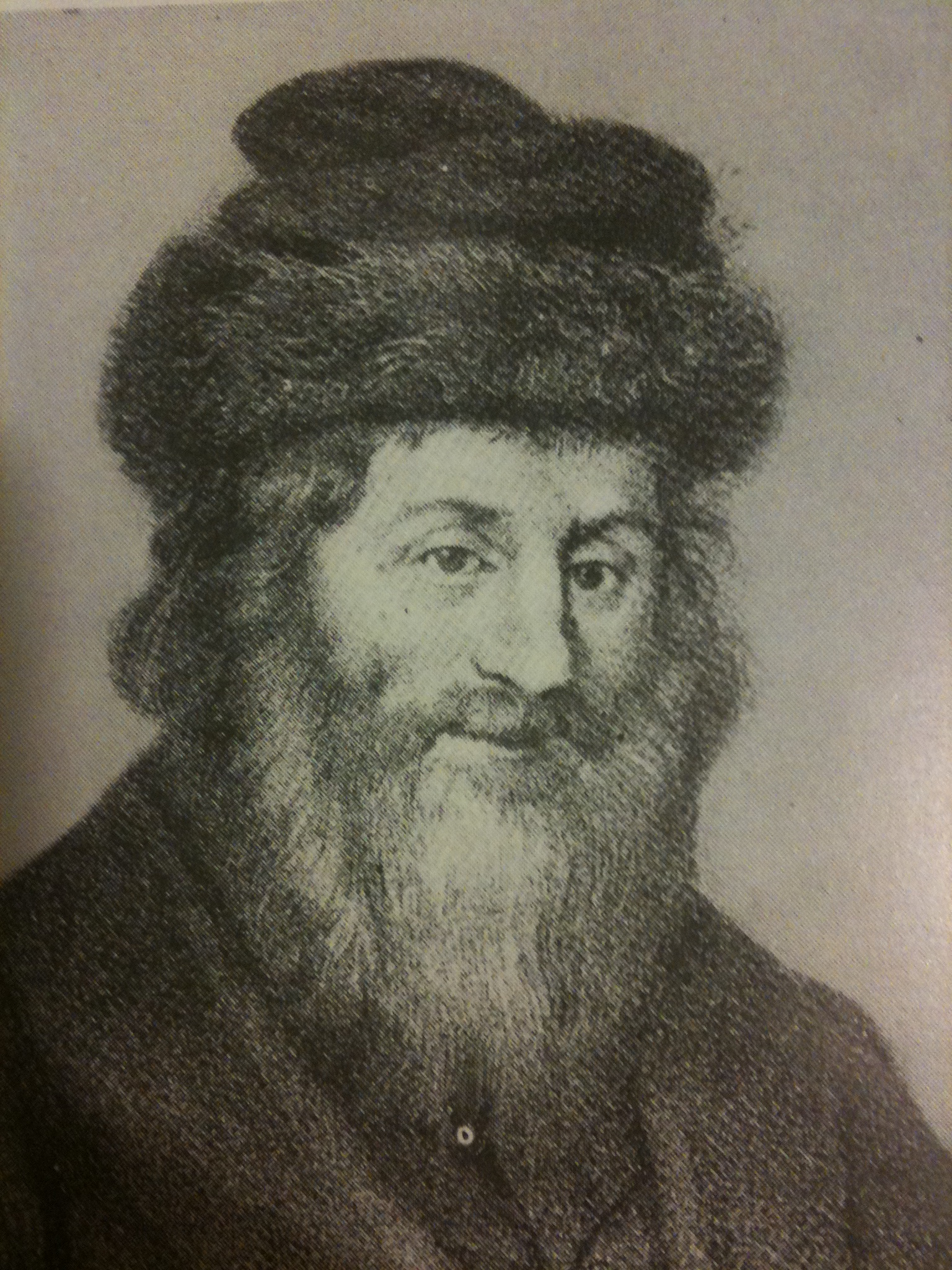
Moses Sofer

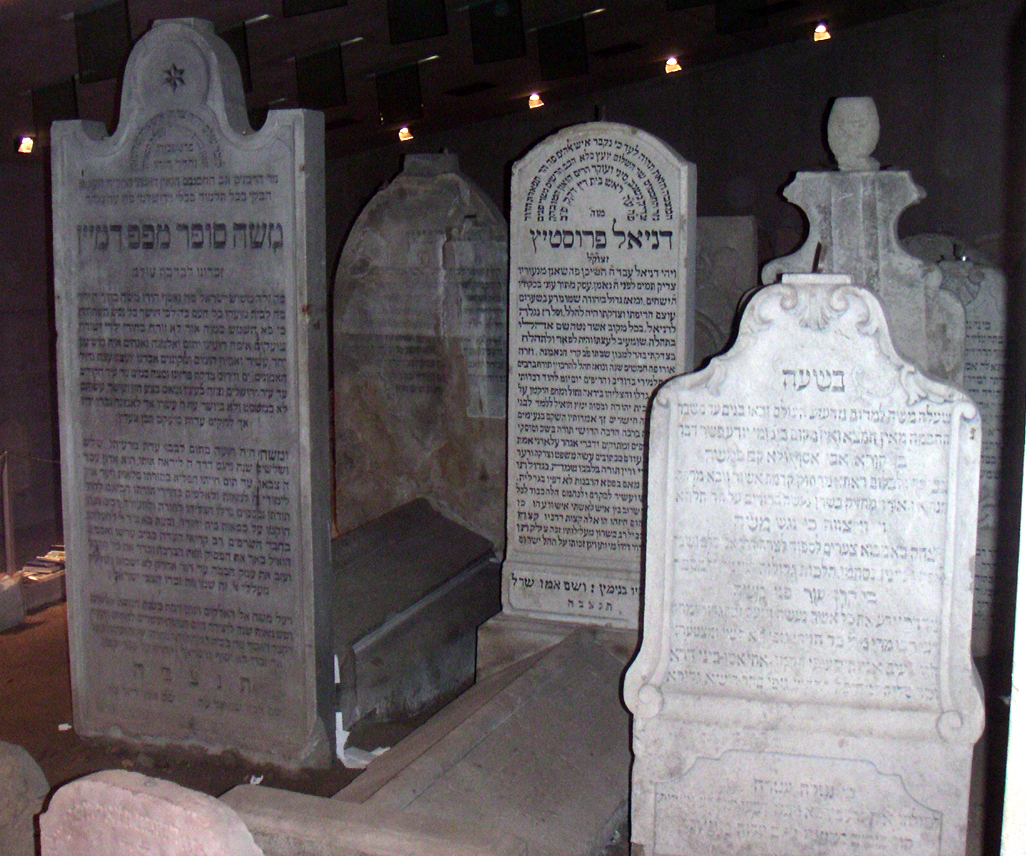
Grave of Moses Sofer
(at the left)

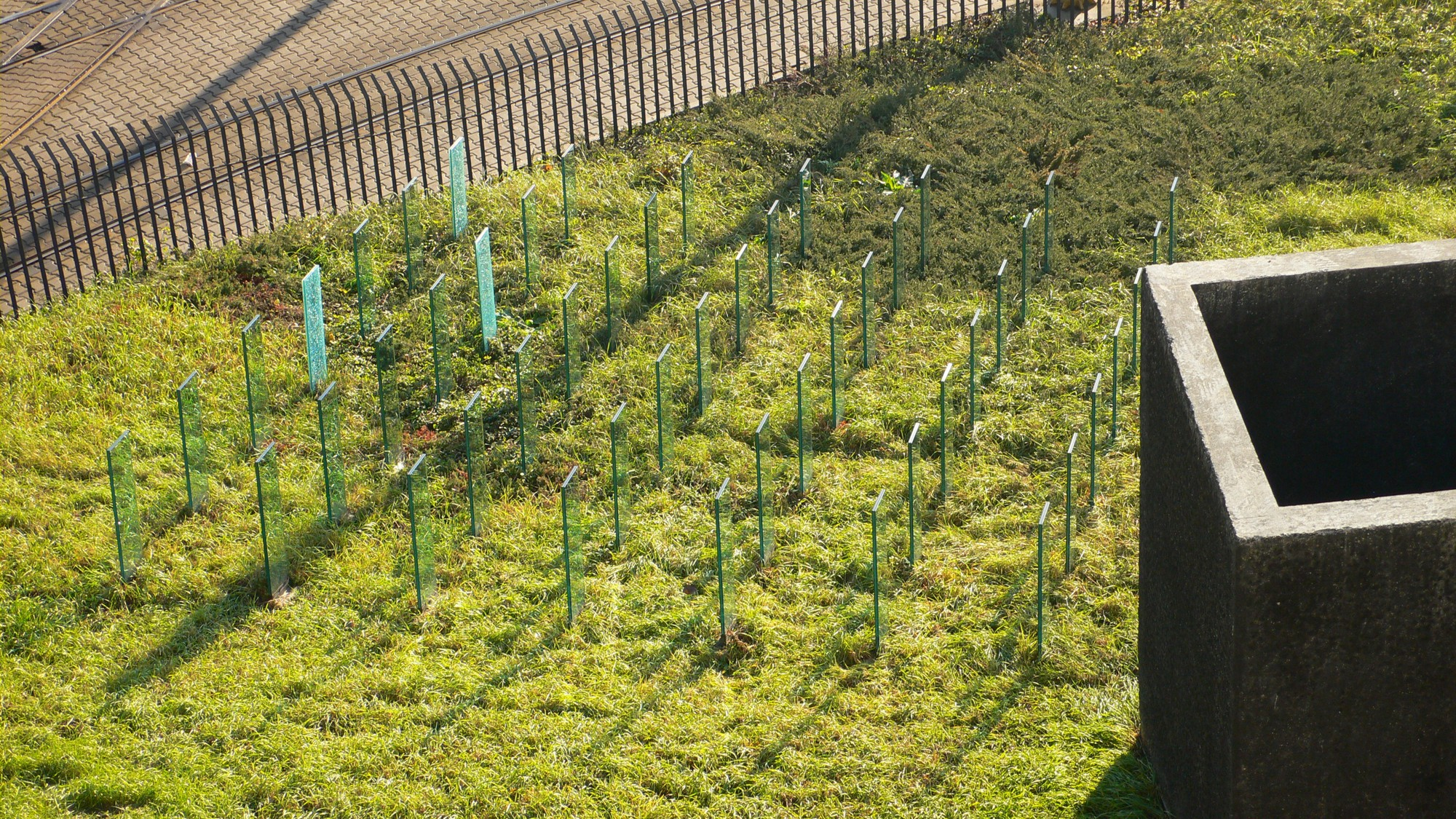
View from above the tunnel

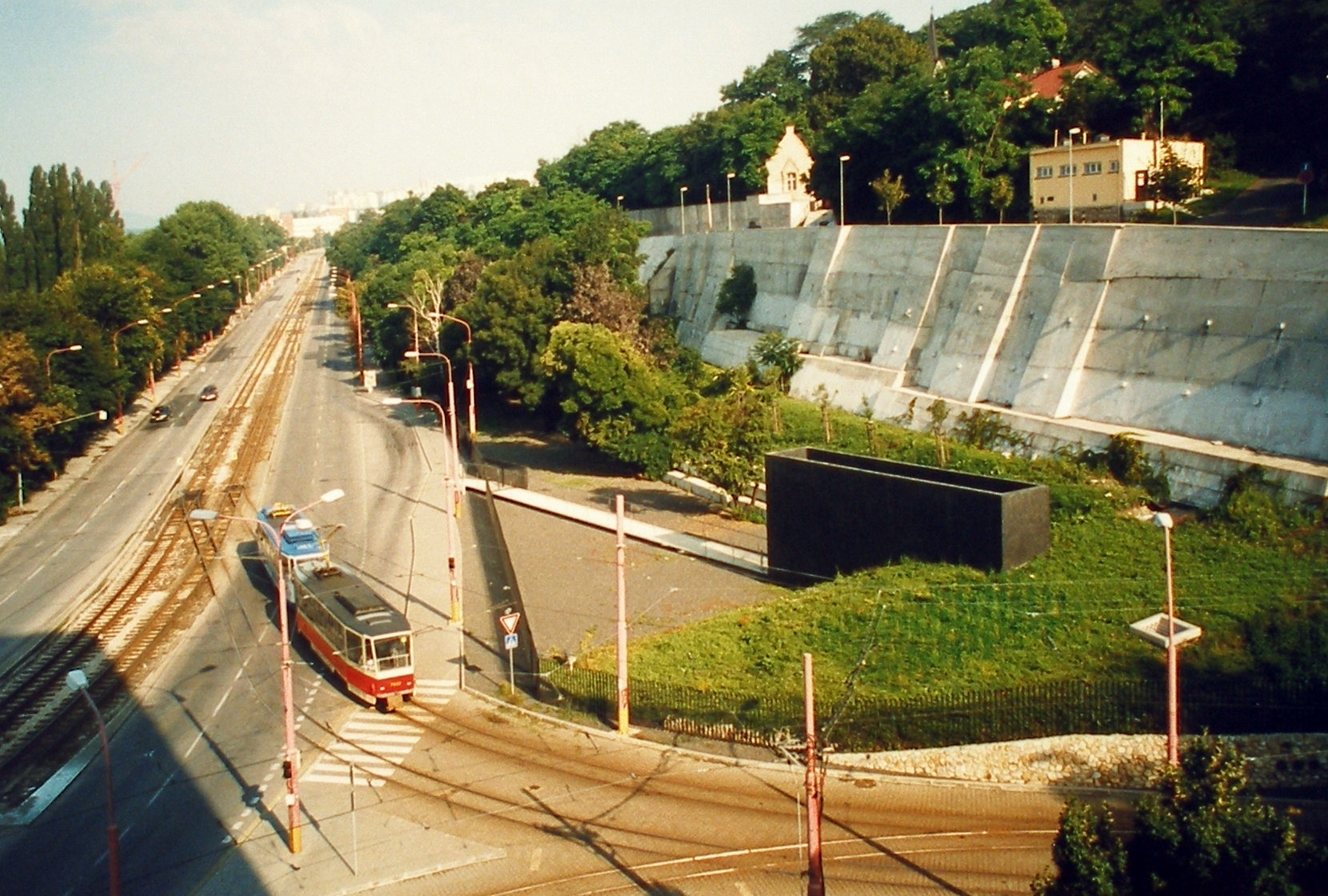
Overview of the memorial before the construction of River Park

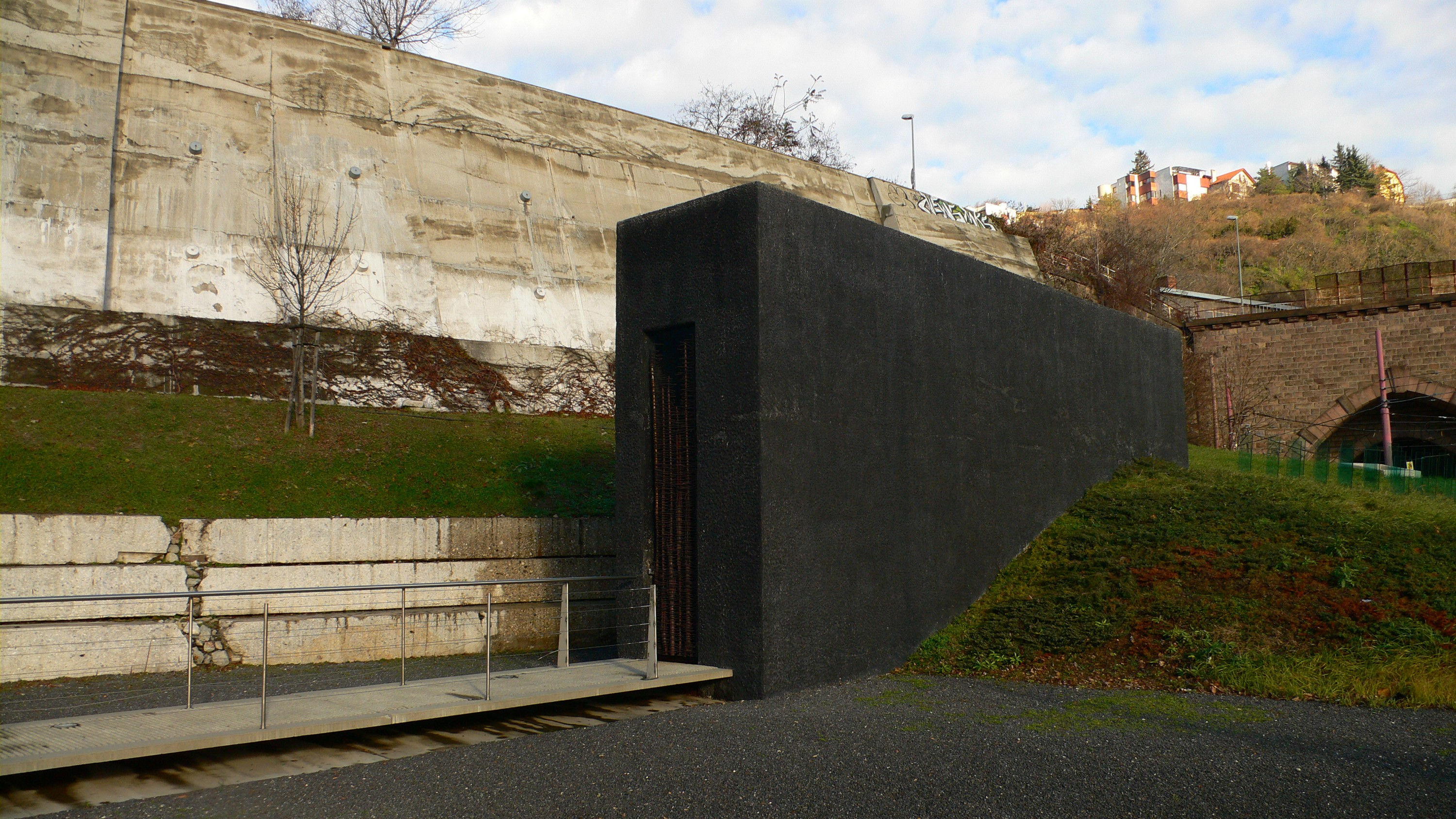
View from in front of the River Park

== See also ==
- Moses Sofer
- History of the Jews in Slovakia
- History of Bratislava
- Tourism in Slovakia
