= Park kultúry a oddychu =

Former complex of buildings in Bratislava, Slovakia

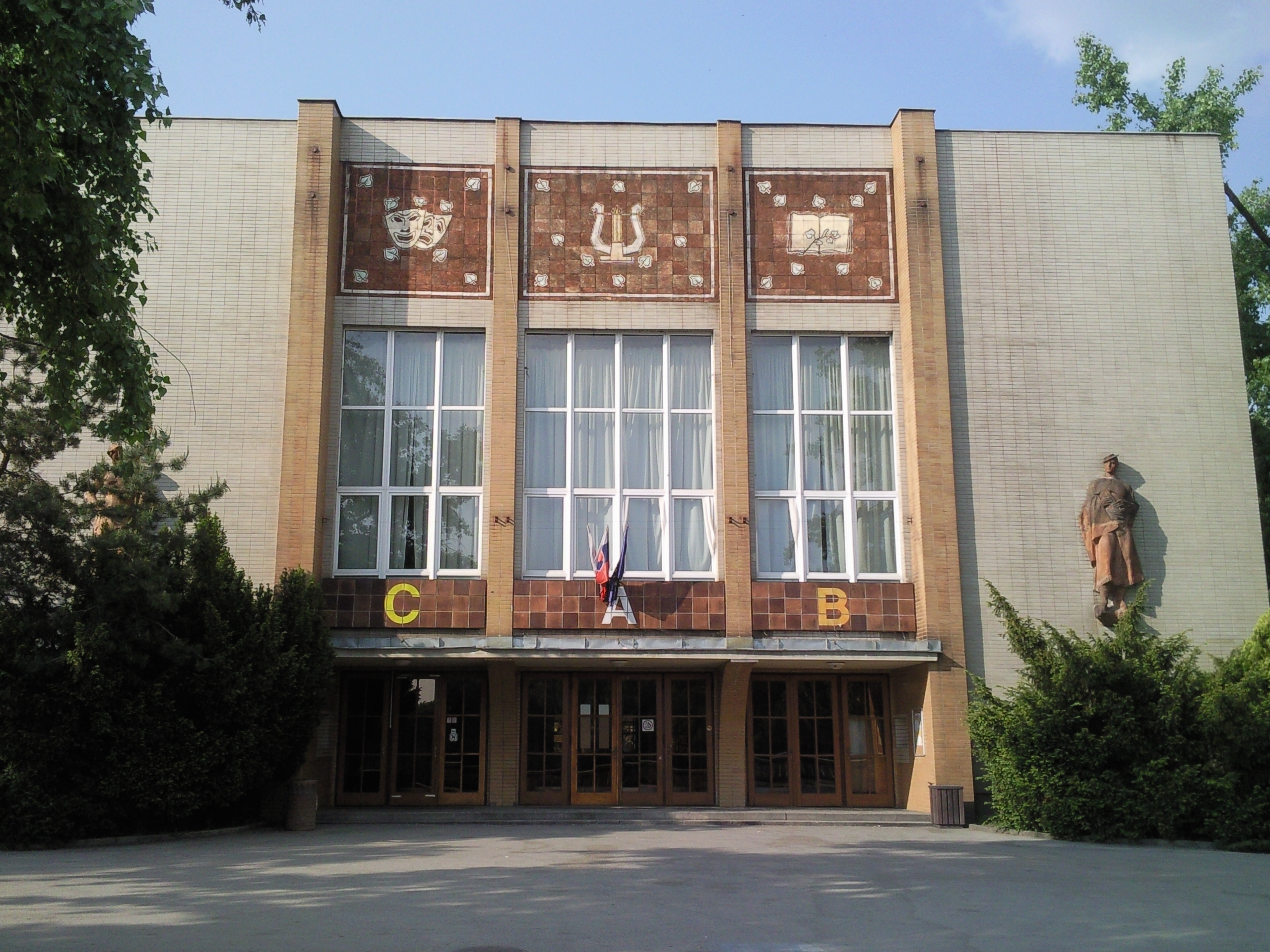
- Park kultúry a oddychu as seen in 2009
- Interactive map of the Park kultúry a oddychu area
- Alternative names: PKO

General information
- Status: Demolished
- Type: exhibition hall
- Architectural style: modernism
- Location: Old Town, Bratislava, Slovakia, Nábrežie arm. gen. Ludvíka Svobodu Street
- Coordinates: 48.1424°N 17.0857°E
- Construction started: 1951
- Completed: 1954
- Demolished: 2016

Design and construction
- Architects: Pavol Andrik, Kamil A. Gross, Ján Štefanec

Park kultúry a oddychu abbreviated PKO (English: Park of Culture and Relaxation) and in the past commonly referred to as Pekáč was a complex of buildings in Bratislava, Slovakia on the Bratislava Riverfront by the Danube, built in 1954 and demolished in 2016. Until 2010, the complex was a major place for cultural events in the capital city featuring musical concerts, TV show tapings, balls, high school proms (Slovak: stužková) and dance class graduations (Slovak: venček). In 2010 Park kultúry a oddychu became the focus of a public scandal concerning the signing of some contracts in secret by the then-Mayor of Bratislava Andrej Ďurkovský resulting in the public learning about the building being demolished in the future.

The buildings contained many artworks both inside and from the outside. The entrance hall contained 28 stained glass windows by national artist Janko Alexy, the floor in the hall was made from unique colored marble from near Lučenec, the first floor above contained a monumental painting Dožinky by academic painter František Gajdoš. The outside of the main building was decorated with two statues by sculptor Tibor Bártfay, above them was a sgraffito decoration.

Park kultúry a oddychu also contained an astronomy section where regular astronomy lectures and nightsky observations were being held. This institution was a lone representative of its kind in the city, uniquely among European capitals, Bratislava lacks both an observatory and a planetarium. Demolition of Park kultúry a oddychu started on 29 December 2015 and finished in the early 2016.

== History ==
Project for the buildings is from the years 1943-1948 by Pavol Andrik, Kamil A. Gross and Ján Štefanec. The buildings were originally built as administrative and exhibition buildings for the Danube fair which took place in the Port of Bratislava but was in need of new, larger premises.

== Significance ==
PKO was the main location in Bratislava for organizing dance class graduations ("venček") with ballroom (standard) dance classes being widely attended during the first half of high school in Slovakia, as well quite popular for organizing school proms ("stužková") and high-school freshmen parties ("imatrikulácie"). As a result, several generations had an emotional bond with the PKO premises.

PKO was also the premier location for performing several types of music in Slovakia.

For me, as a musician, PKO is a palace comparable to Lucerna in Prague, Royal Albert Hall in London or Madison Square Garden in New York. To perform there and sell it out has always been the highest aspiration of local musicians.

— well-known Slovak jazzman Peter Lipa

== Future ==
An investor constructing a new planetarium, media library, square and the promenade with a pier on the site, in addition to flats and office spaces, which will be part of the River Park 2 project.

== Gallery ==
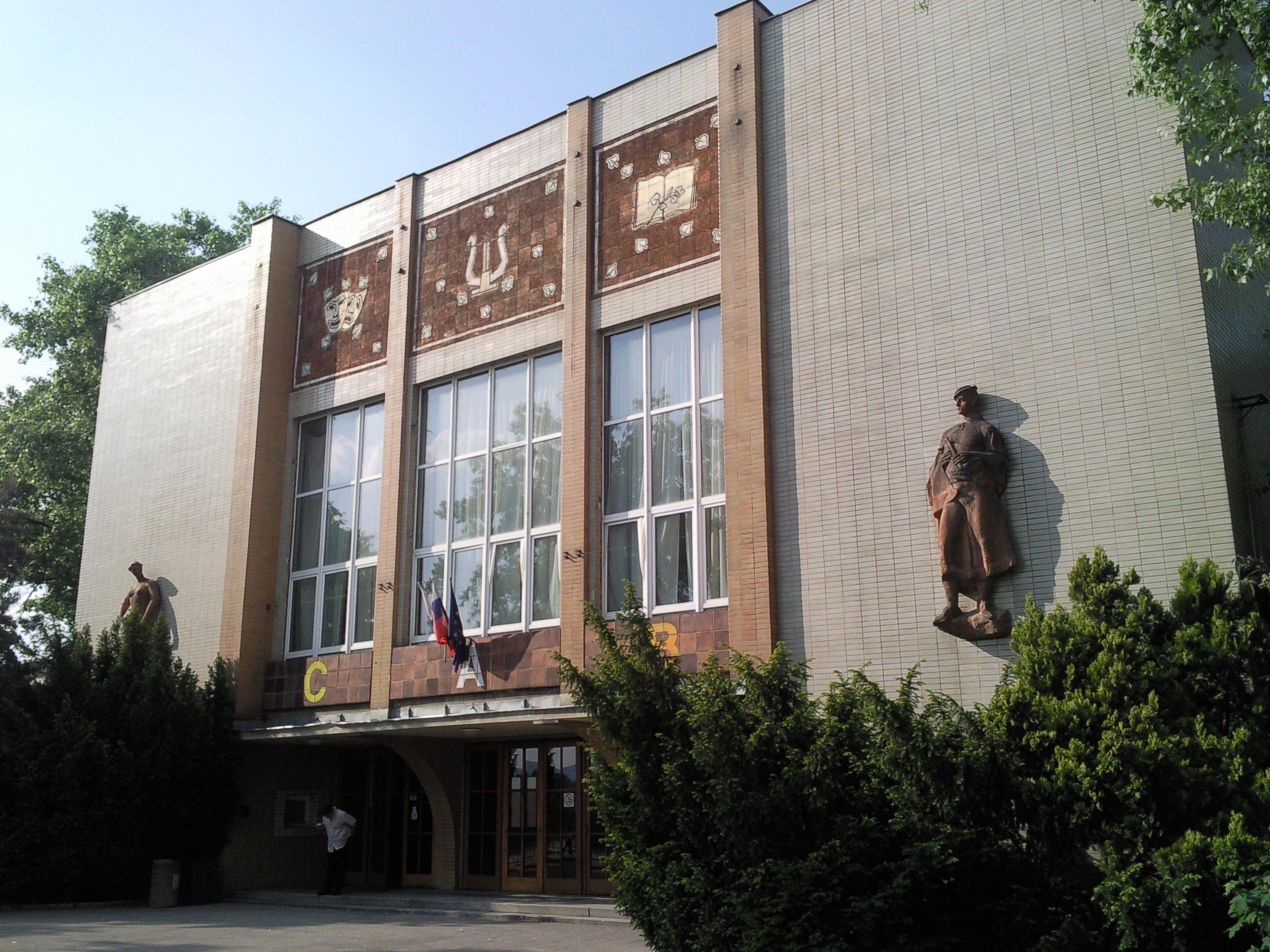
Main entrance of the main building

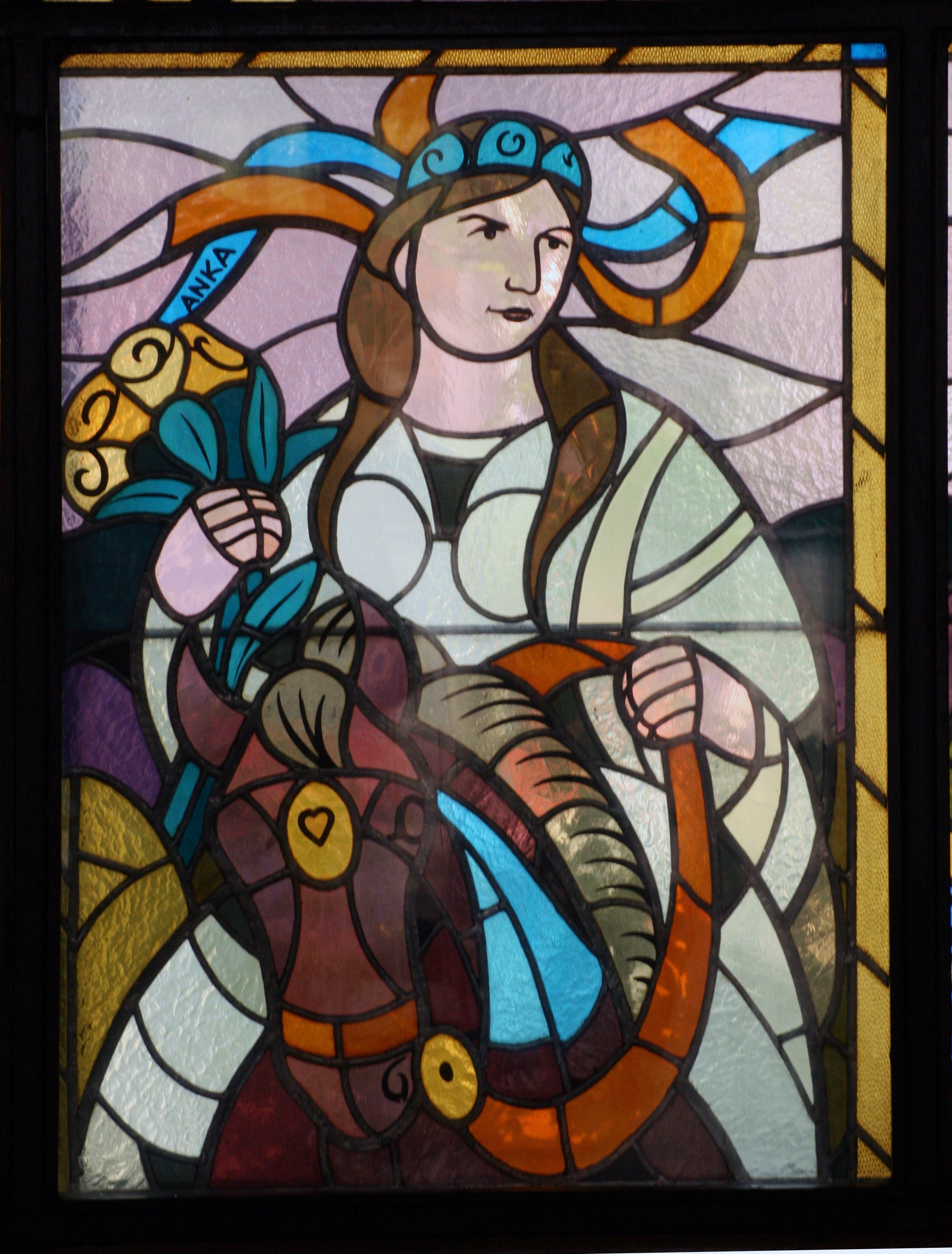
Stained-glass windows in the interior from the year 1957 by national artist Janko Alexy

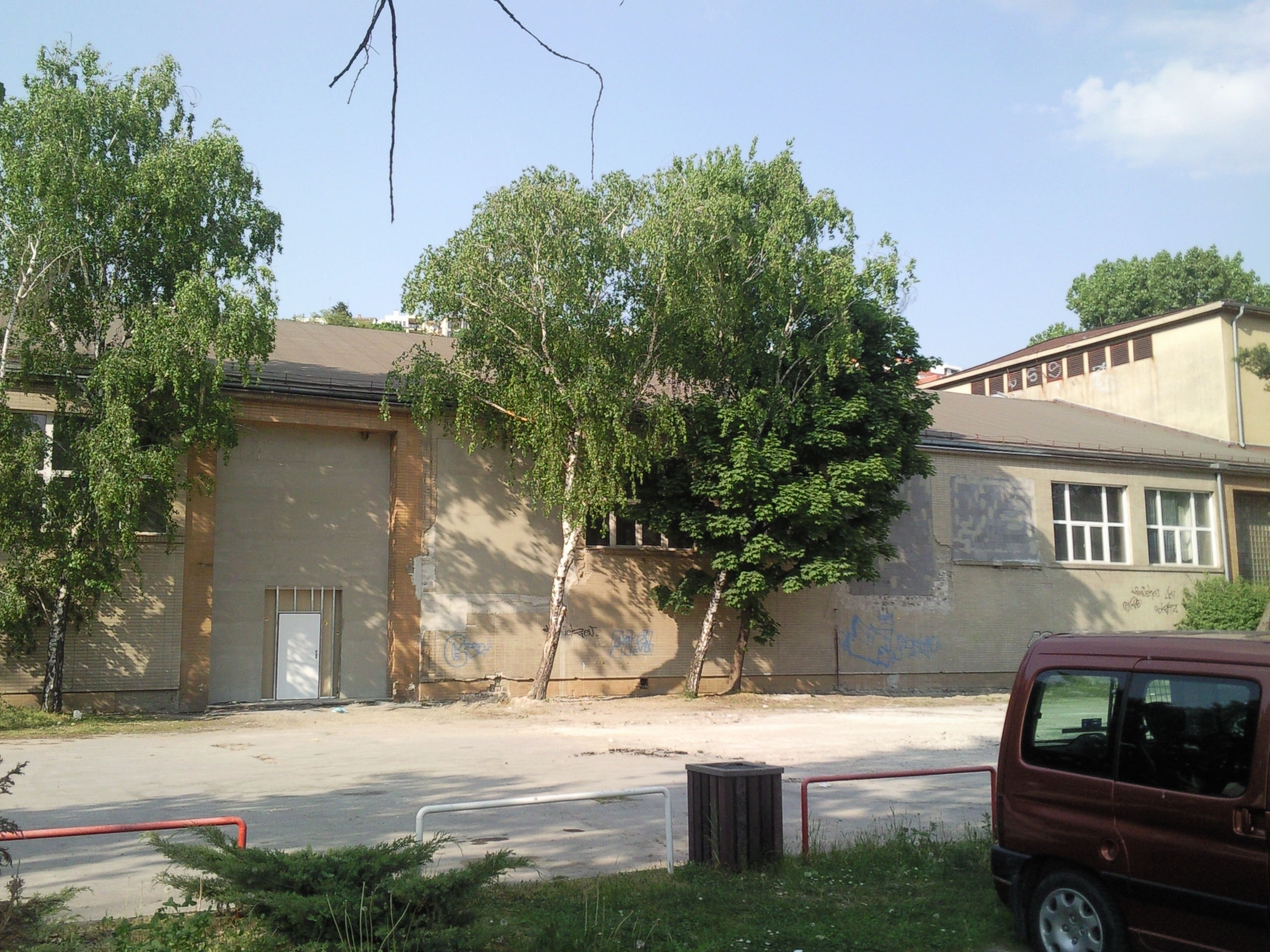
Part of PKO from the outside

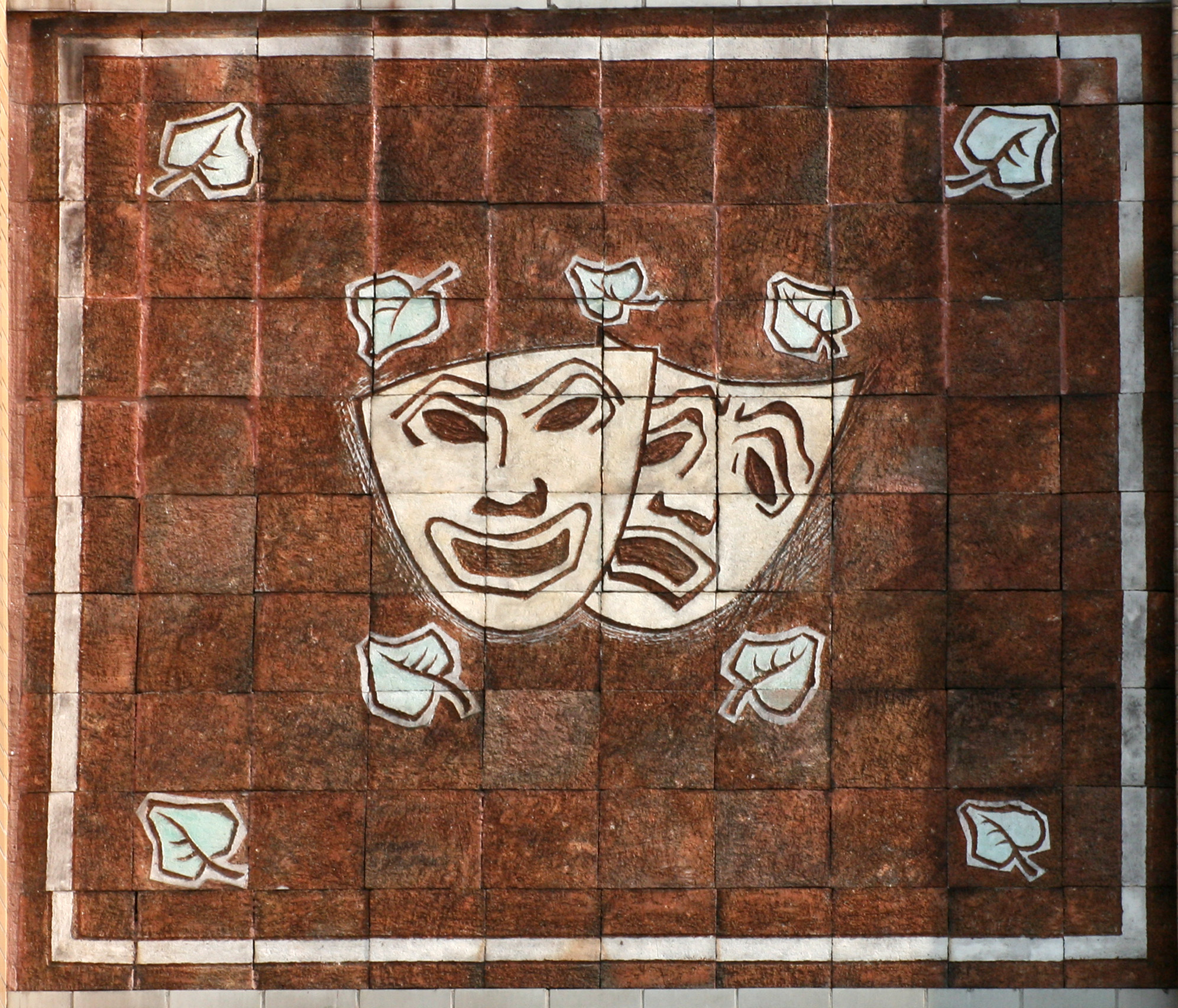
Detail of the mosaic on the outside of the main PKO building

== See also ==
- River Park
