= Janko Alexy =

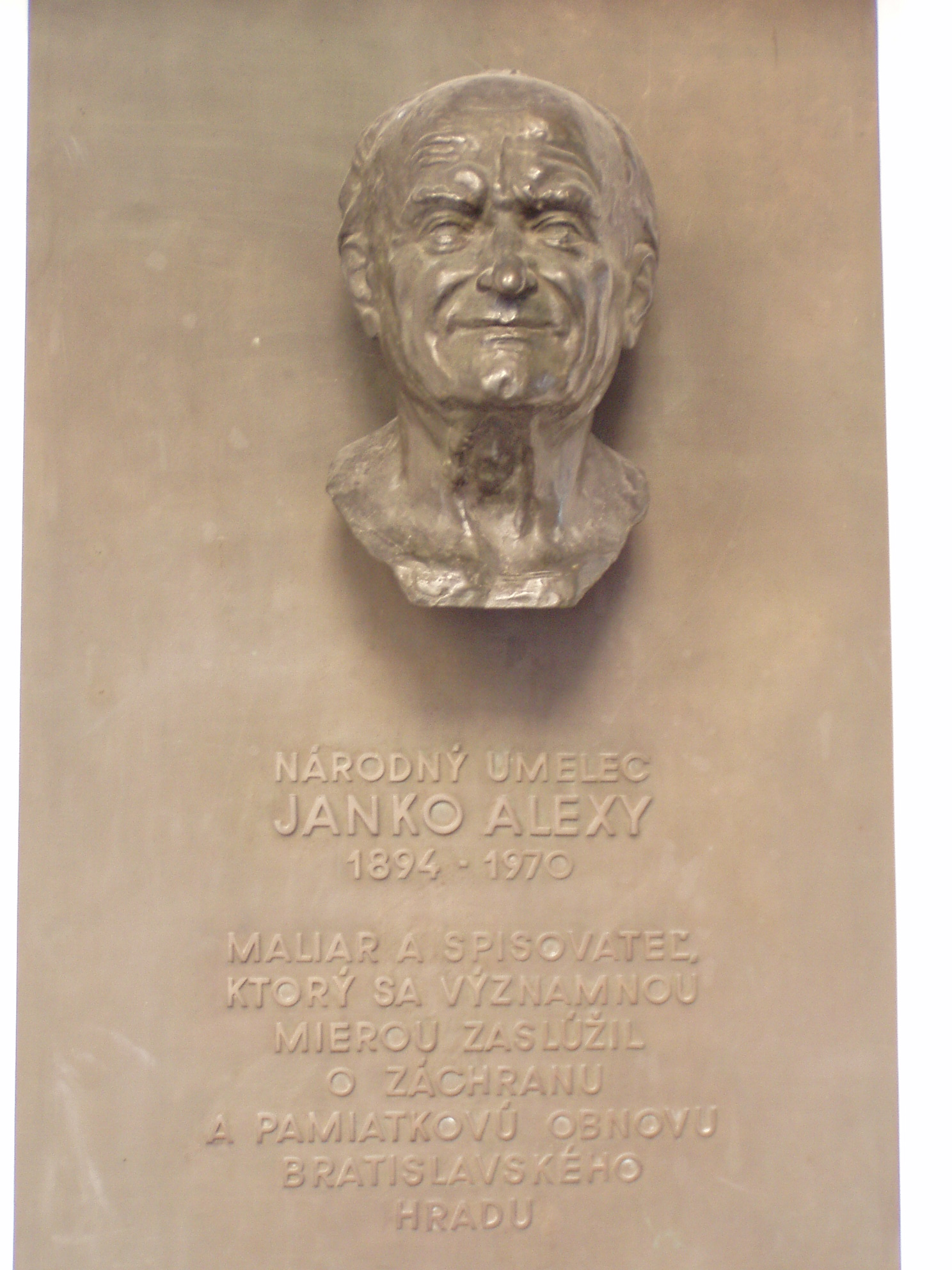
Memorial plaque in the Bratislava Castle

Janko Alexy (25 January 1894 in Liptovský Mikuláš – 22 September 1970 in Bratislava) was a famous painter, writer, and publicist of Slovak origin. He is generally recognized (together with Martin Benka and Ľudovít Fulla) as one of key personalities in the beginning of Modern Slovak Art.

== Life ==
He studied at the Akademie Výtvarných Umění (Academy of Visual Arts) in Prague by Vlaho Bukovac, Maximilian Pirner and Max Švabinský. He lived in Liptovský Mikuláš, Martin and from 1937 in Bratislava.

He began his creative artistic career with socially motivated expressive works from the environment of the urban periphery, as he called it. He developed genre painting in an original way, inspired by ballads, folk songs and legends (Hôrni chlapci – Mountain Robbers). He also devoted attention to stained glass and tapestries. Pastel was his most characteristic artistic technique. Alexy's decorative genre of pastels is prevalent throughout his rural pieces (Kúria Baanovcov v Trstenom – Curia of the Baans in Trstené). Alexy was especially adept at painting cityscapes, though peculiarly, for usually an air of abstract expressionism resided in the works.

He also created several models for architectural projects, e.g. the window-pane at the P. O. Hviezdoslav Theatre in Bratislava.

In his literary works J. Alexy preferred themes from the life of Slovak bohemia and autobiographical topics: Život nie je majáles (1956, Life is Not a May Festival), Osudy slovenských výtvarníkov (1948, Destinies of Slovak Graphic and Plastic Artists).
