= Lanfranconi Bridge =

Motorway bridge in Bratislava, Slovakia

Coordinates: 48°08′33″N 17°04′31″E

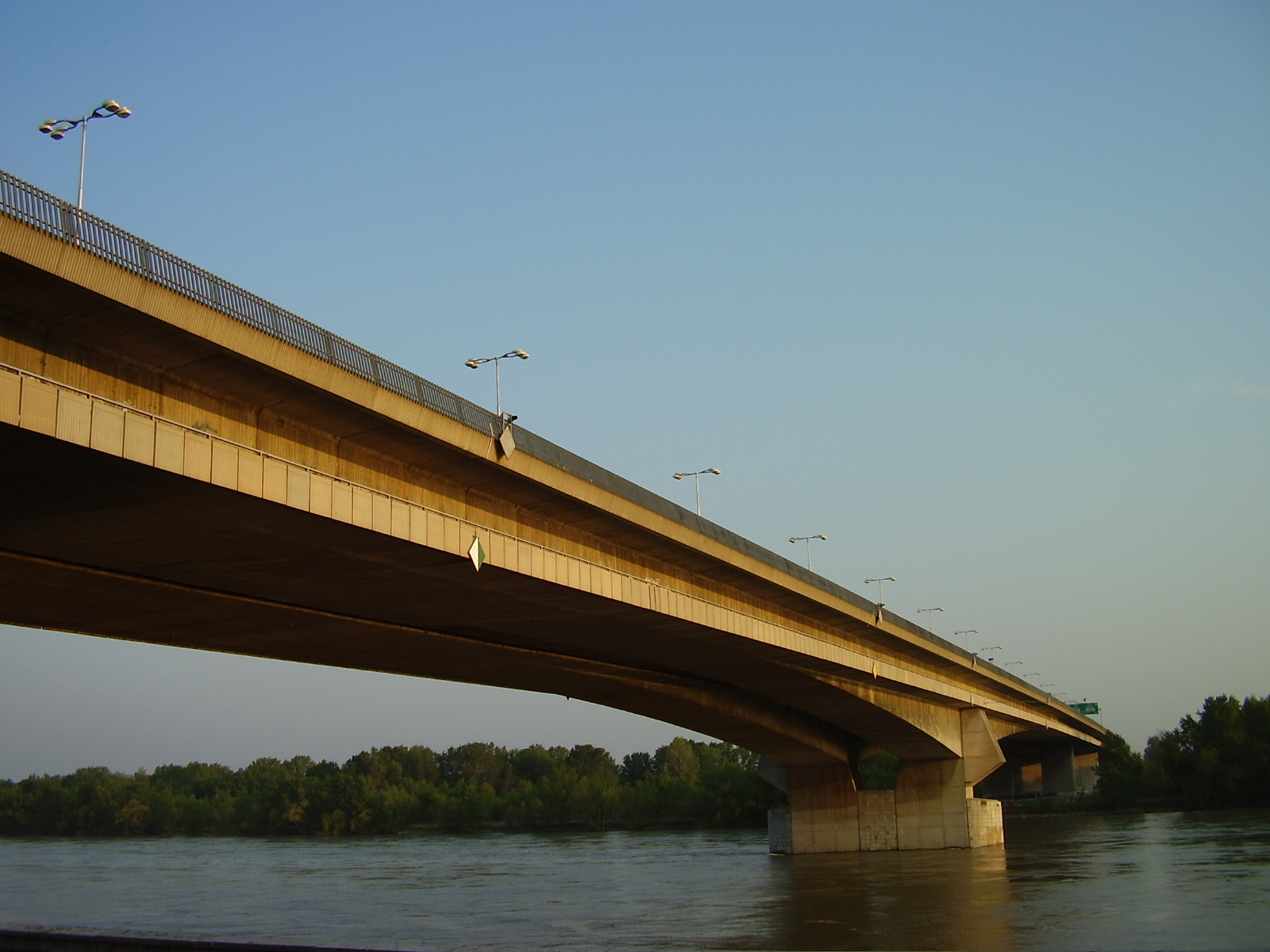
Lanfranconi Bridge from the northwestern side

Lanfranconi Bridge (Slovak: Most Lanfranconi, previously Most mládeže or Youth Bridge) is a concrete motorway bridge in Bratislava, Slovakia, located on the D2 motorway. It was built in 1985–1991, with its right half opened in 1990 and the rest in 1992. It is 766 m long (1134 m with access viaducts), and has a 30 m wide four-lane motorway. There are lanes for cyclists and pedestrians as well. It crosses the Danube.
