= Downtown Bratislava =

Downtown Bratislava Bratislavský downtown
- CBD-like quarter
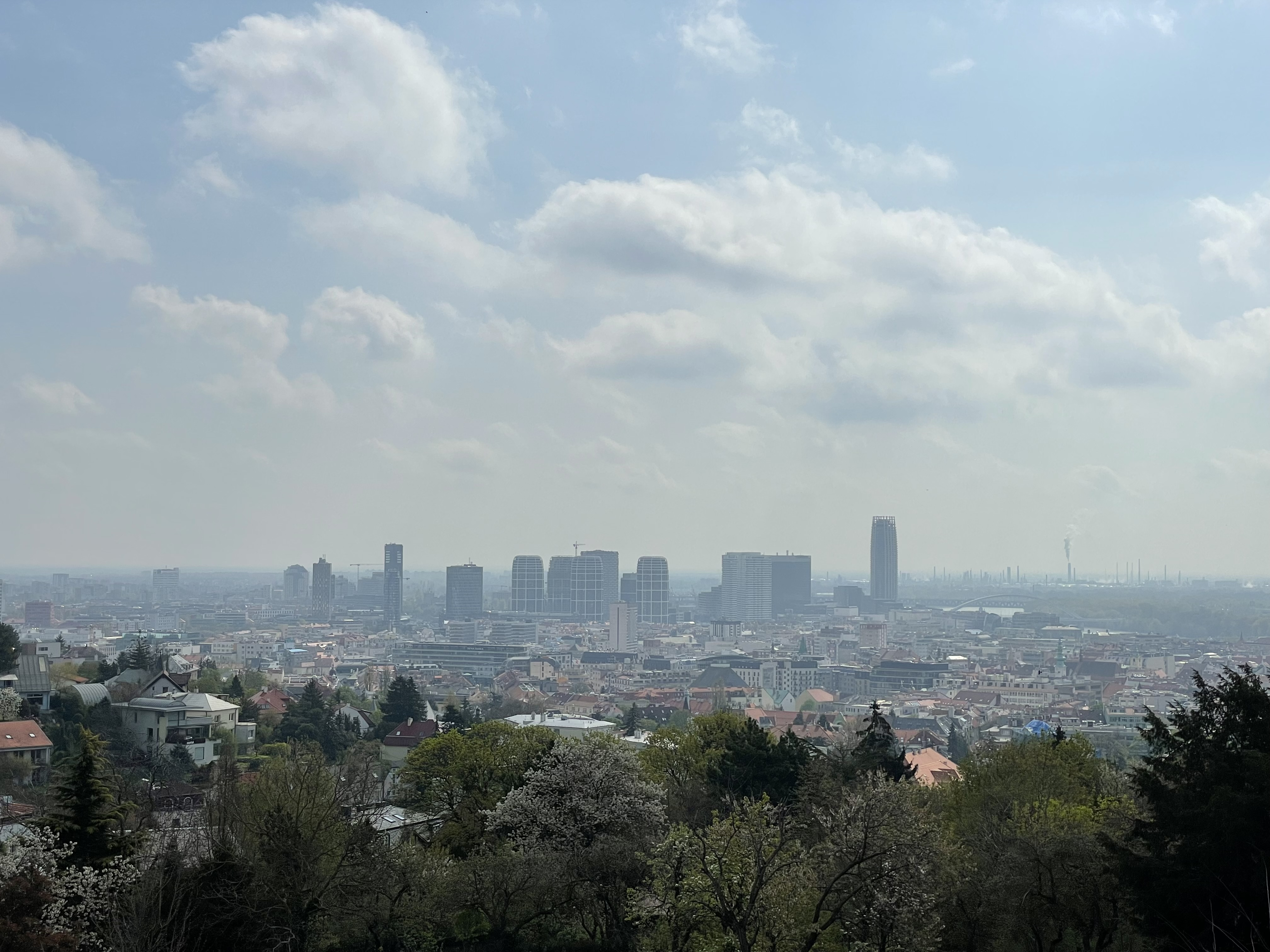
- Skyline in 2023
- Interactive map of Downtown Bratislava
- Country: Slovakia
- City: Bratislava
- Borough: Old Town; Ružinov
- Industrial part: approx. 1880s
- Distinct city-quarter: approx. 2010s

Area
  - Total: 0.73 km^{2} (0.28 sq mi)
- (Note: The quarter is not strictly defined, therefore the area is approximate. Given area corresponds to land enclosed by streets Karadžičova, Páričkova, Dula Square, Košická, Mlynské nivy, Súkennícka, Prístavná, Košická, Apollo Bridge, by the river Dunaj, by the Old Bridge, and by the street Dostojevského rad. This does not include neigbouring areas designated for similar developer project not yet built. The measurement was done by a tool on the website of Geodetic and Cartograpgic Insititute.)
- Elevation: 140 m (460 ft)

Downtown Bratislava (Slovak: Bratislavský downtown, sometimes referred to as the new city center of Bratislava) is a commercial as well as popularly used name given to a rapidly developing quarter of Bratislava, composed primarily of residential and office high-rises. Similarly to other cities, it is a former industrial district on the edge of town, which has seen large-scale redevelopment after the industrial activity declined, city expanded, and the area had become part of the broader city center. The quarter is split between the Old Town and Ružinov boroughs. It houses the majority of buildings taller than 100 meters in Bratislava.

Dispersed between the high-rises, the quarter contains some buildings of the industrial heritage, that were built in the 19th and 20th century. At the beginning of the 20th century, the are was occupied by prominent Bratislavian factories such as Kablo (cables), Klinger (textile), Apollo (oil refinery, predecessor of today's Slovnaft) and Cvernovka (threads). The Apollo oil refinery was the target of a famous bombardment by Ally forces during the World War II. The oil refinery is commemorated by the name of Apollo Bridge. Majority of the industrial buildings have been demolished, however, notable examples of those remaining are Jurkovič Heating Plant, part of the Cvernovka factory, and Warehouse No. 7 in the river port.

== Name ==
The word "downtown" in the name of the quarter is used also in the Slovak original, where it is a kind of semantic specialization – it is used to describe an urban landscape resembling CBD, not a city centre in general.

In Slovakia, the quarter is also commonly called Bratislavský downtown (literally "Bratislava's downtown"), with the word "downtown" being borrowed from American English here. However, unlike in American English, the word is not used to describe any city center in general. For that purpose, Slovak uses the word centrum instead, so the city center of Bratislava would be called centrum Bratislavy. This distinction is intentional, since the terms "centrum Bratislavy" (city center of Bratislava) and "Bratislavský downtown" (Bratislava's Downtown) are used to describe two different locations in the city. The former refers to the historic center, or the entire broader city center, whereas the latter refers to this newly developing high-rise qarter.

== List of developer projects and original buildings ==
List of developer projects and original buildings in the area

Map

=== Developer projects ===
Name	Picture	Developer	State	Construction	Height	Designed purpose	Notable parts	The part's picture
Apollo Residence		Apollo Residence	finished	2010 – 2019		residential		
Downtown Yards		J&T Group	under construction	since 2023		residential, office		
Eurovea		J&T Group	finished	1st part before 2008, 2nd part 2019 – 2023	168 m	shopping mall, residential, office	Eurovea Tower	
EHQ		Immocamp	under construction	since 2026		residential, office	an industrial heritage hall on Bottova	
Ganz House		J&T Group	finished	2024 – 2026		residential, office		
Chalupkova		Penta Investments	under construction	since 2024		residential, office		
Klingerka		J&T Group	finished	2019 – 2021	115 m	residential, office		
Metropolis		Mint	finished	2021 – 2023		residential		
Nivy Station		HB Reavis	finished	2017 – 2021	125 m	shopping mall, bus station, office tower	Nivy Tower	
Panorama Towers		J&T Group	finished	2013 – 2016	112 m	residential		
Sky Park		Penta Investments	most towers finished, last one under construction	since 2017	119 m	väčšina veží bývanie, sčasti kancelárie	Jurkovič Heating Plant	see below
Twin City		HB Reavis	finished	2016 – 2018	89 m	office	Twin City Tower	
Zwirn		YIT	1st part finished, 2nd under construction	since 2018	–	residential, office	„Pradiareň 1900“ – part of the former Cvernovka factory	see below

=== Notable buildings pre-dating current developement ===
Name	Picture	The renovation's developer	Origin	Height	Designed purpose	Notable parts
Headquarters of the Ministry of Interior			1931 – 1932		government building	
New building of the Slovak National Theatre			1986 – 2007		theater	
Tower 115		J&T Group	1980s	104 m	office	
The VÚB Bank headquarters			1990s	88 m	office	

=== Heritage buildings ===
Name	Picture	The renovation's developer	Origin	Height	Original purpose	Notable parts
Jurkovič Heating Plant		Penta Investments (as a part of the Sky Park)	1942		factory building	
Pradiareň 1900, part of the former Cvernovka factory		YIT (as a part of Zwirn)	1900 – 1910		factory building	
Warehouse No. 7			1920s		warehouse	
Továrenská 10			19th/20th century			
Umelka			1926		an association's headquarters	
Factory hall on Bottova		Immocamp (as a poart of EHQ)	1940s		factory building	

=== Gallery ===
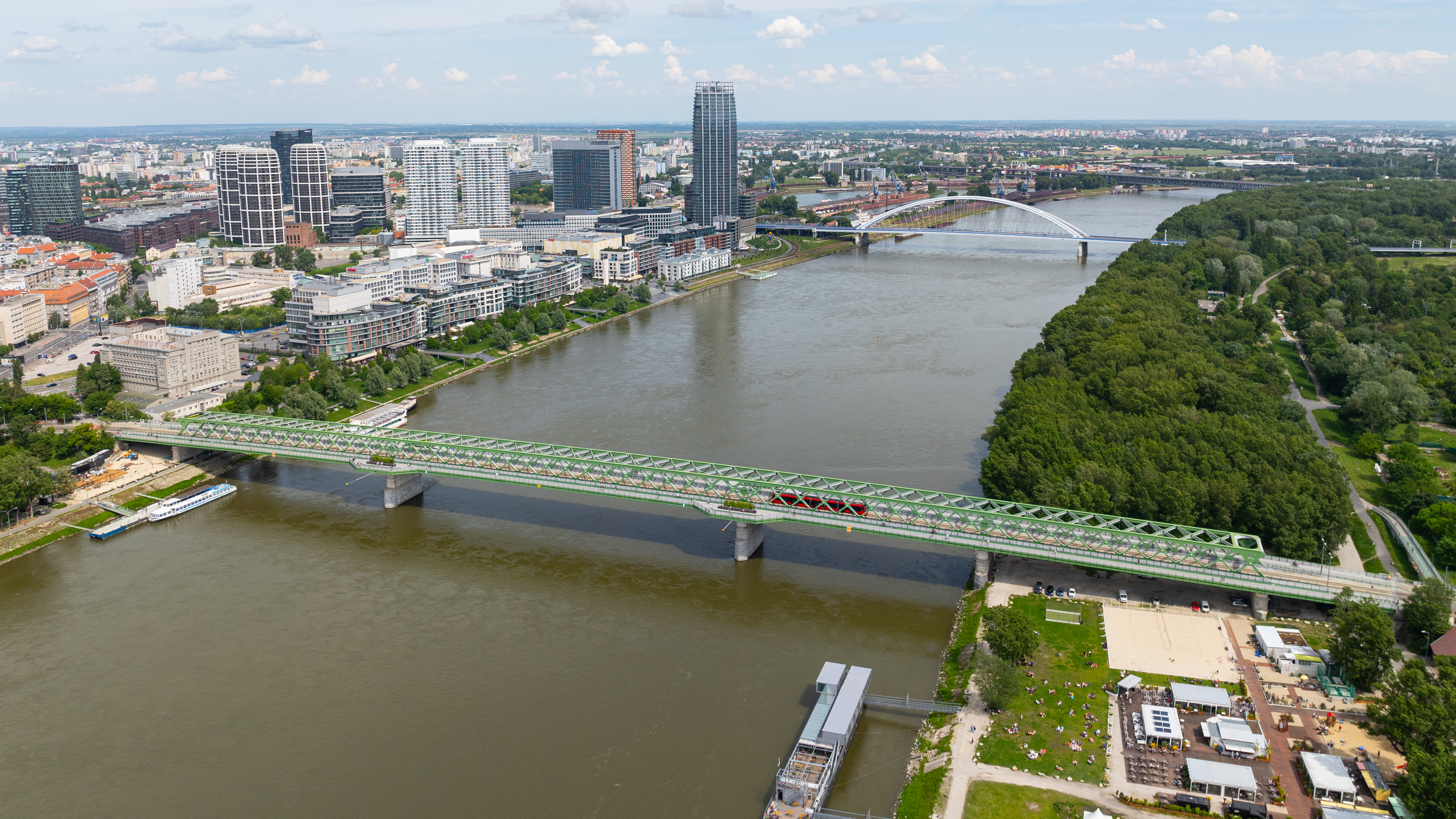
View from the Danube, 2023

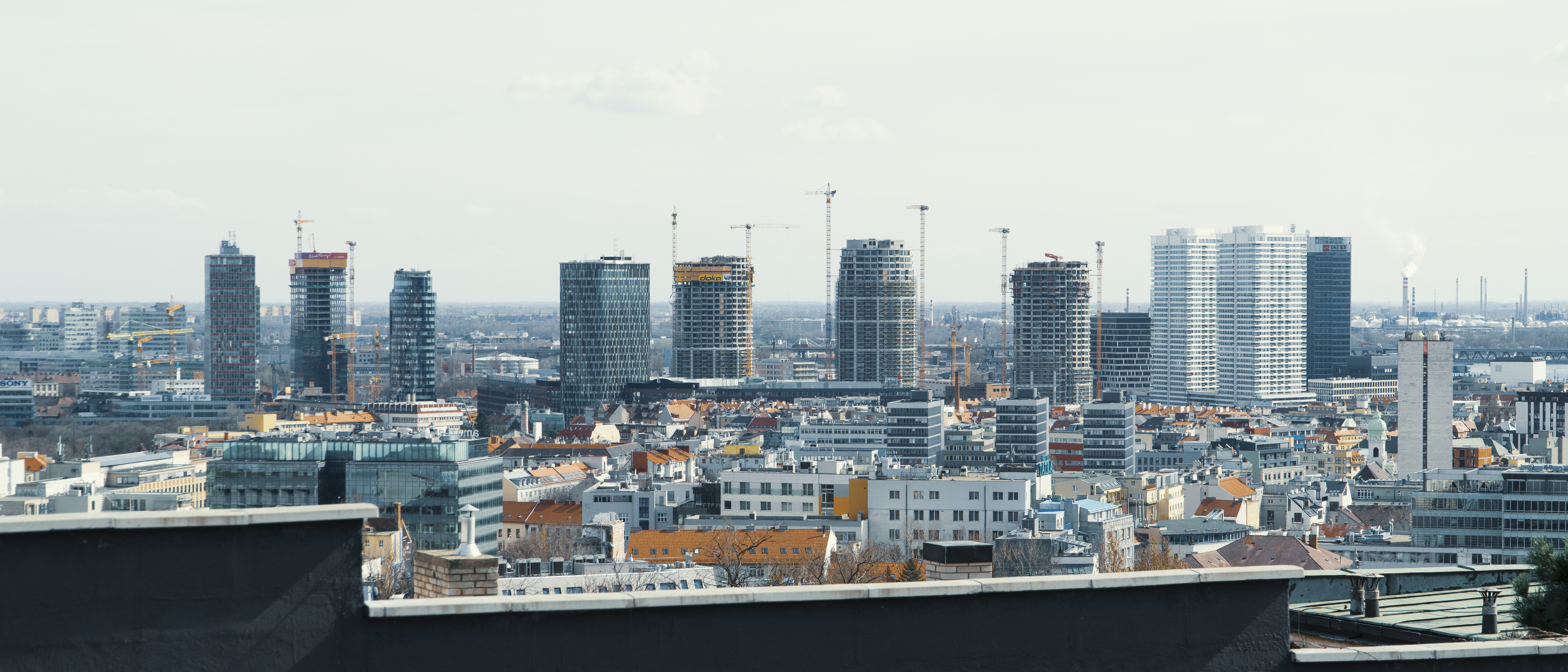
Skyline, 2019

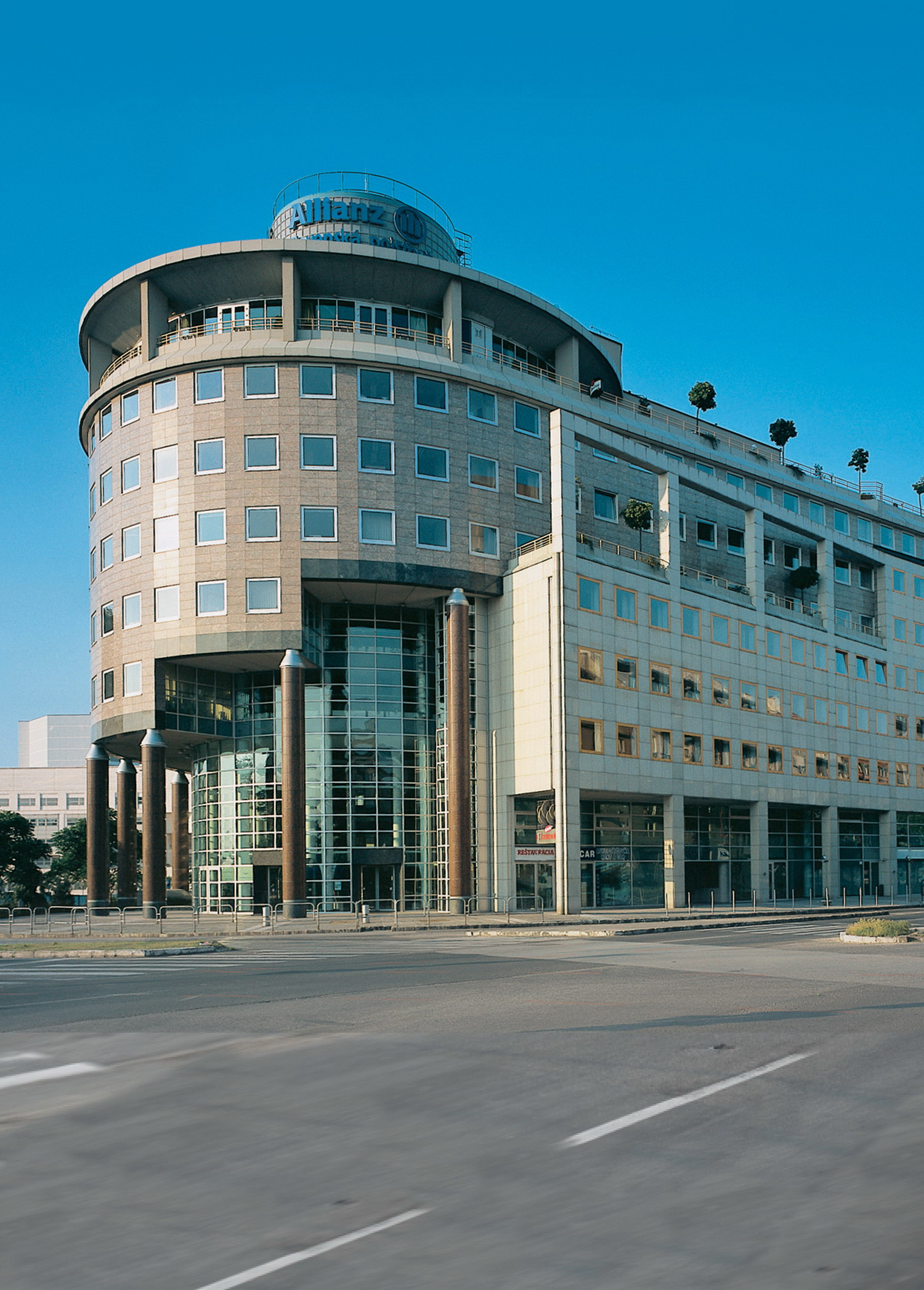
One of the original office buildings in the area

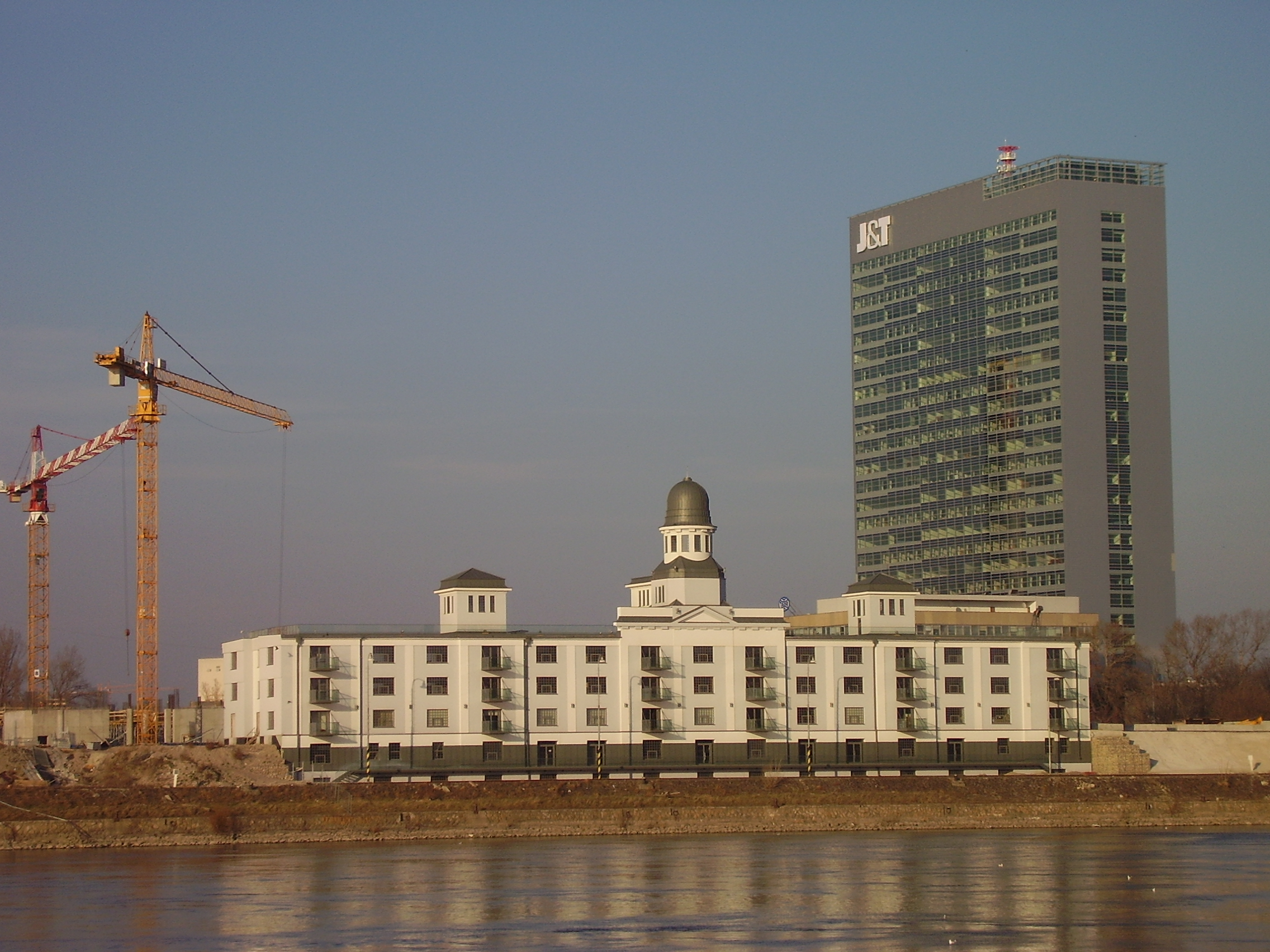
Warehouse No. 7

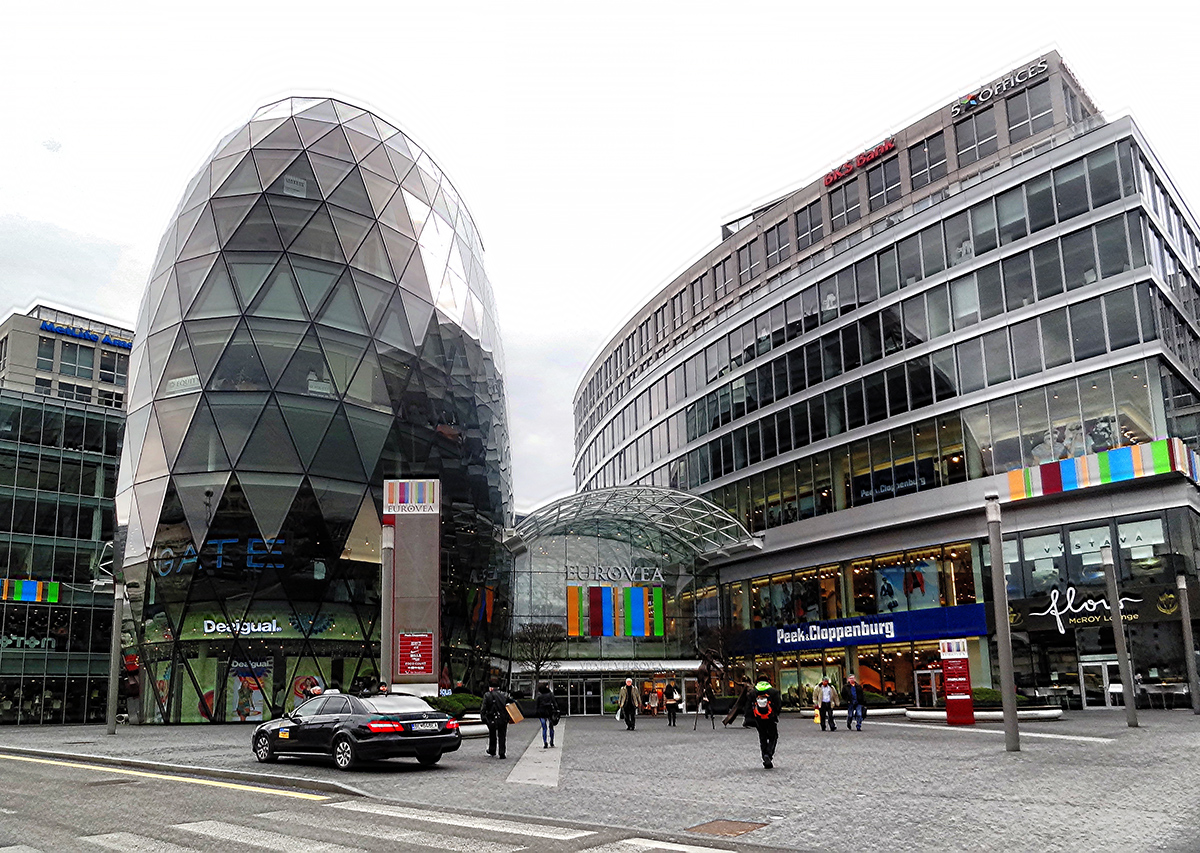
Eurovea Galleria Shopping Mall

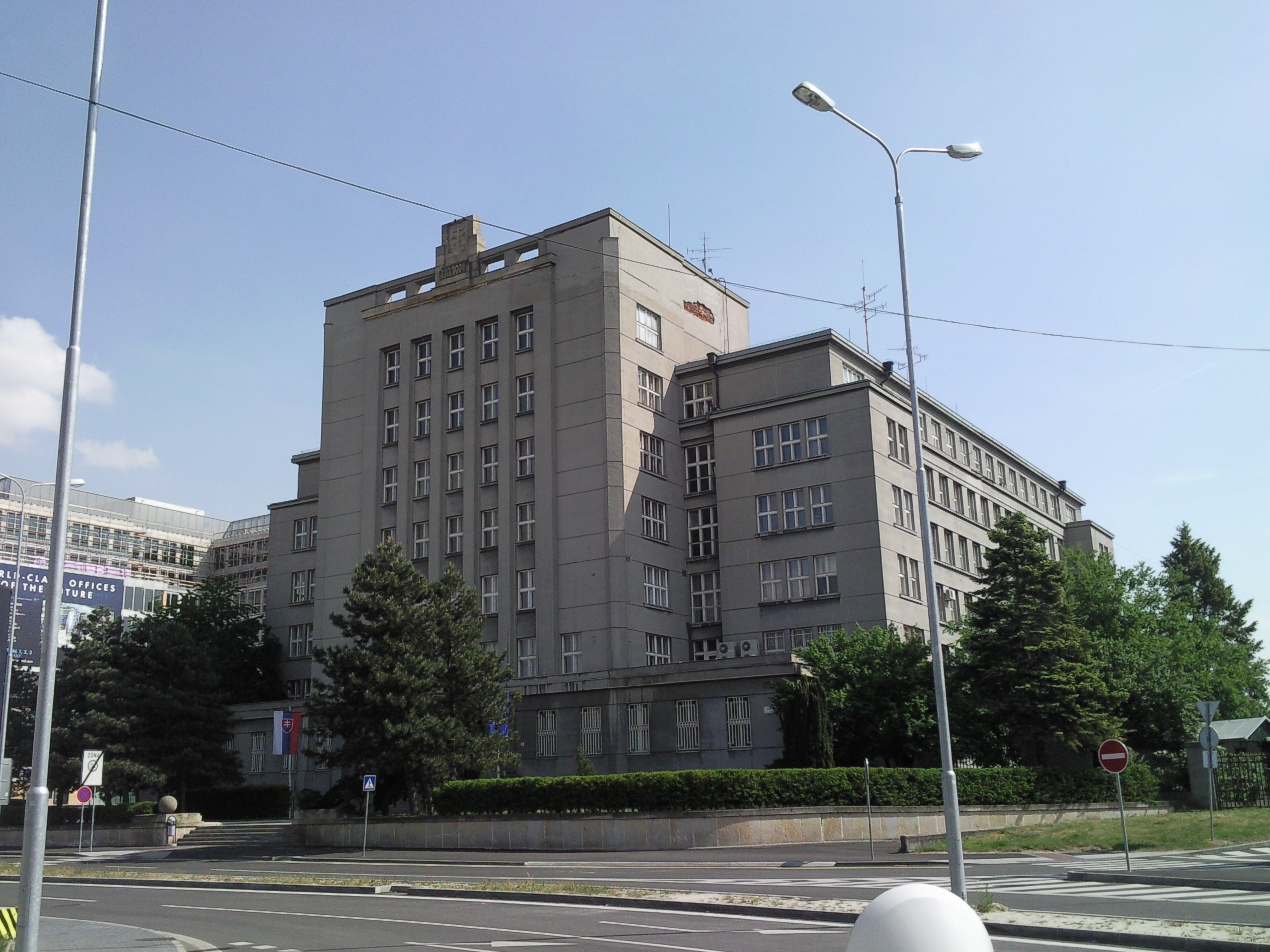
Headquarters of the Ministry of Interior

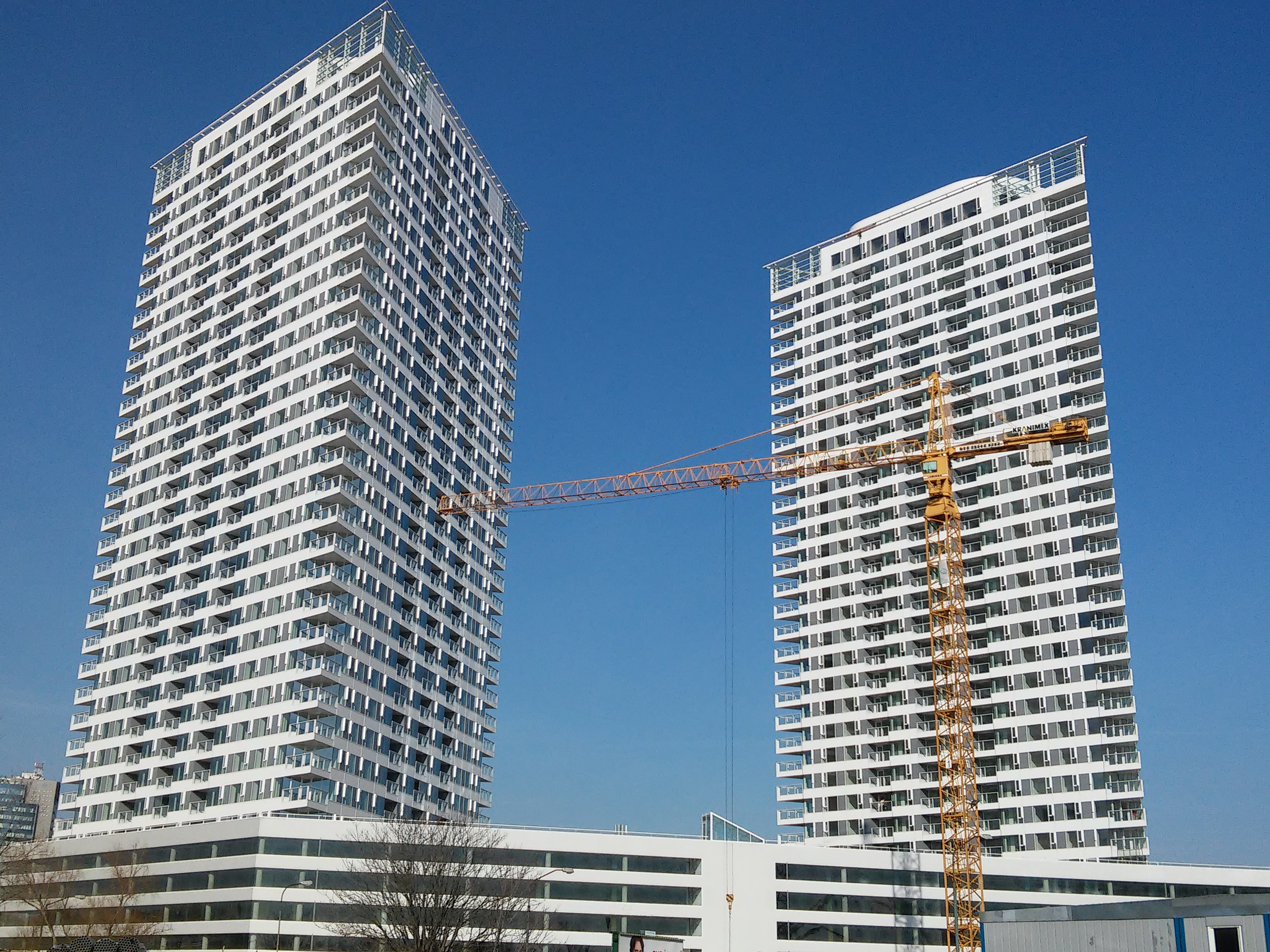
Panorama Towers, 2016

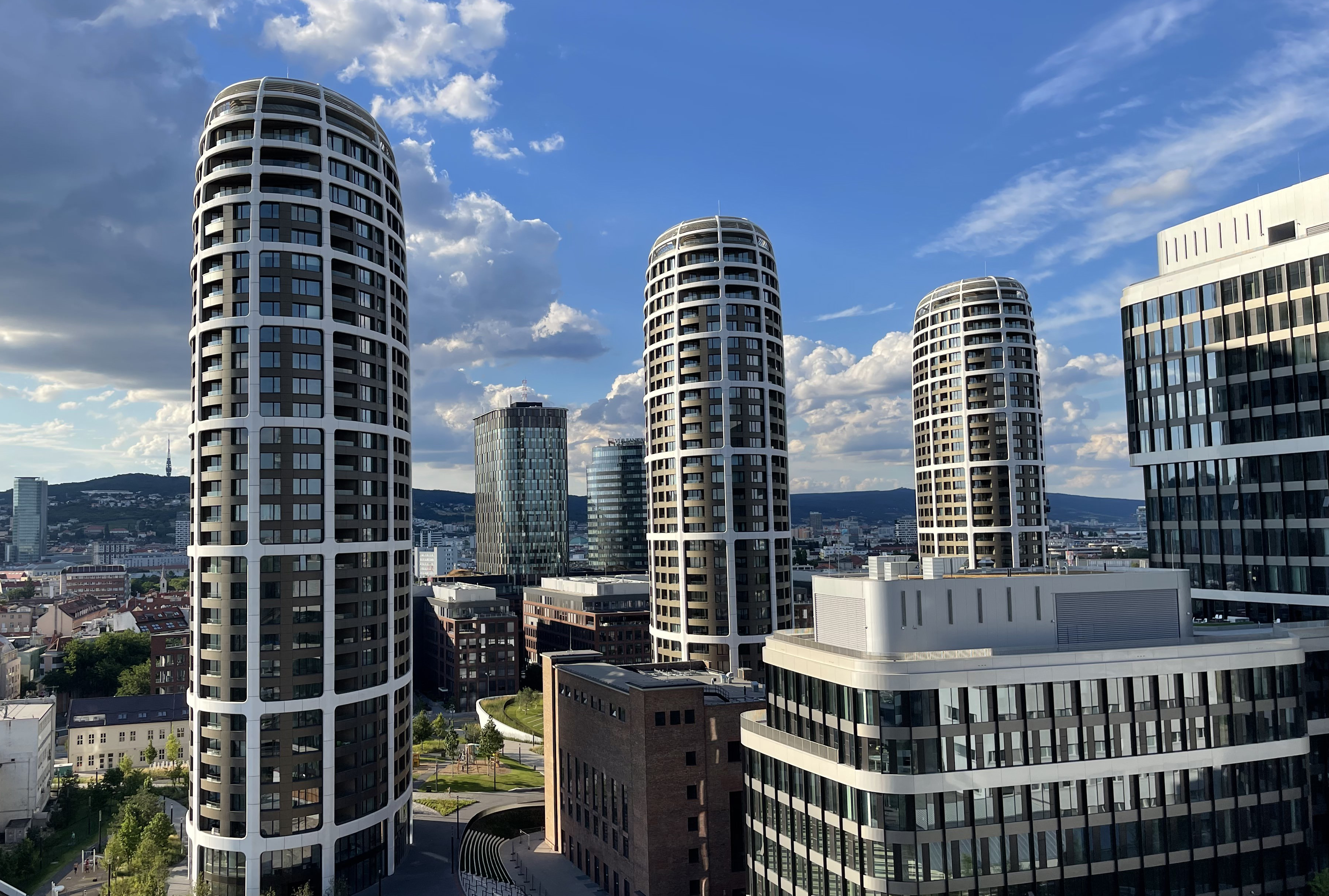
Sky Park, 2021

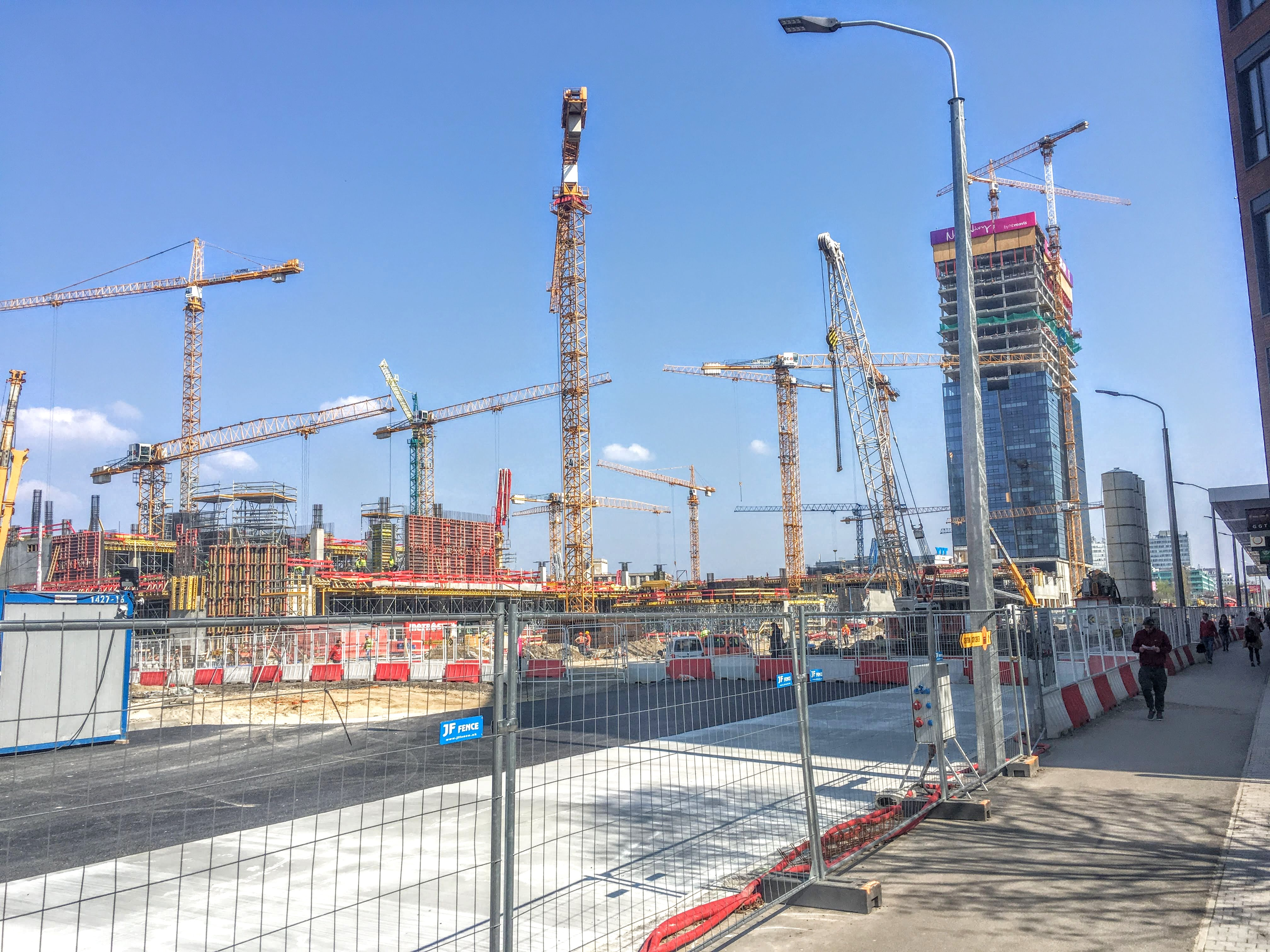
construction of the Nivy Bus Station

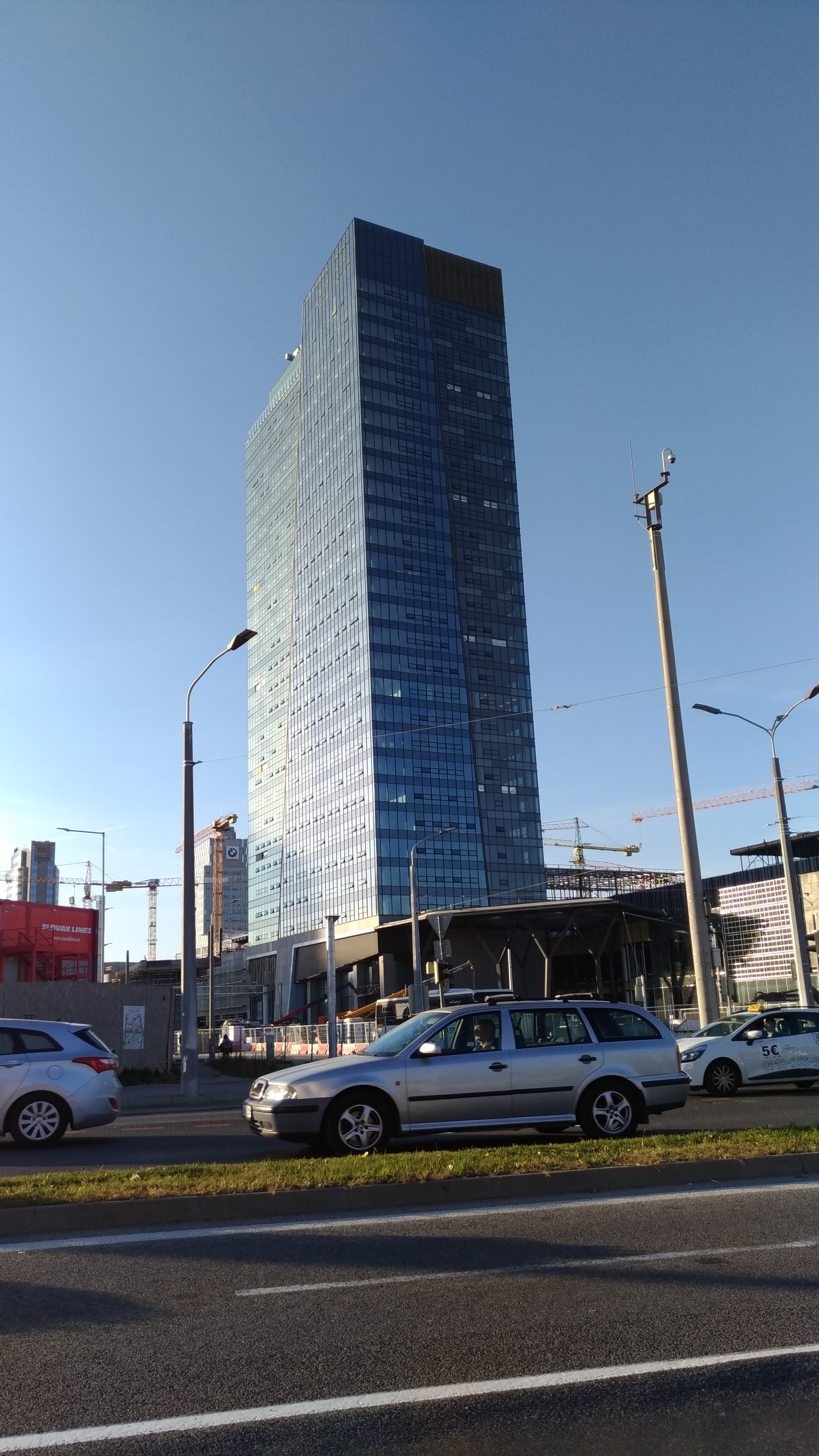
Nivy Tower, 2019

Tower 115, 2010

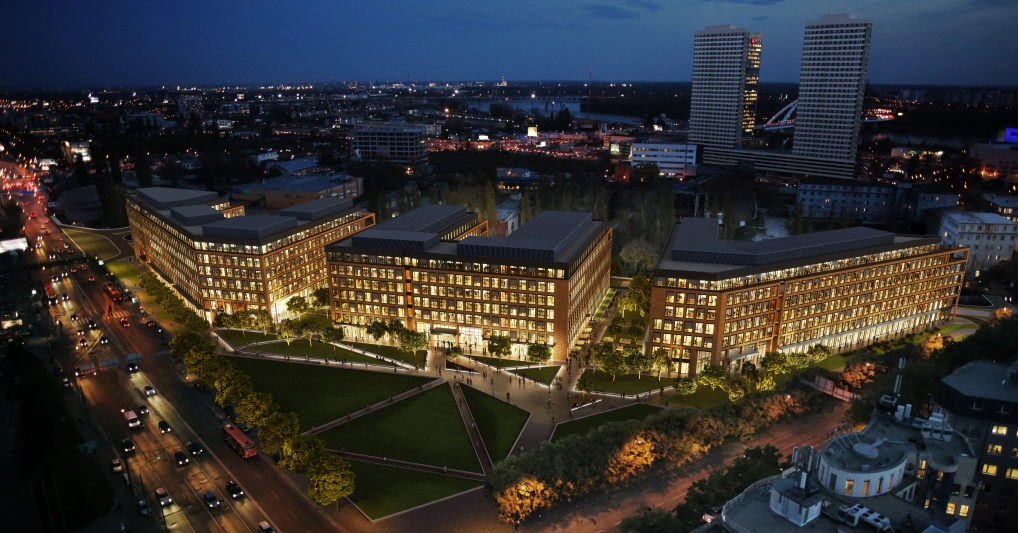
Twin City without the Twin City Tower

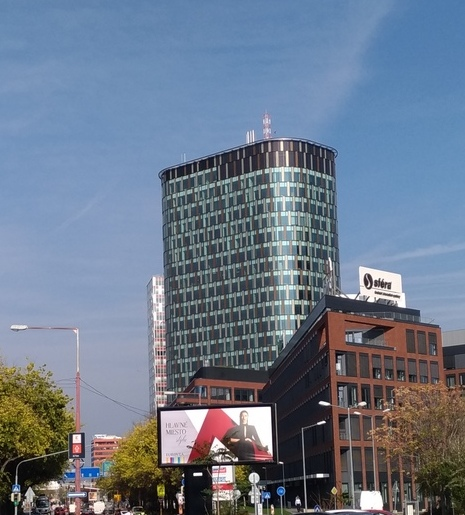
Twin City Tower, 2019

VUB Bank headqiarters, 2000

Pradiareň 1900
