= Ján Gerthofer =

Slovak war pilot

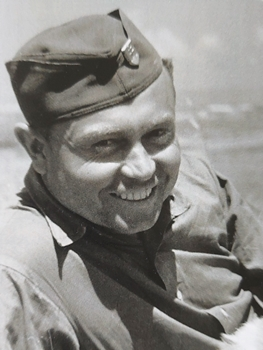
- Born: 27 May 1910; Láb, Austria-Hungary (Modern day Slovakia)
- Died: 9 August 1991 (aged 81); Podbrezová, Czechoslovakia
- Military career
- Allegiance: Czechoslovakia (1927-1939, 1945-1951) (Slovak Republic (1939–1945)) Slovakia (1939-1944)
- Branch: Czechoslovak Air Force (1927-1939, 1945-1951); Slovak Air Force (1939-1944); Slovak Resistance Air Force (1944)
- Service years: 1927–1951
- Rank: First lieutenant (nadporučík)
- Unit: 13 JG 52
- Conflicts: World War II
- Awards: War Victory Cross; Iron Cross, 1st Class

Ján Gerthofer (27 May 1910 – 9 August 1991) was a Slovak war pilot. He was the third-highest scoring fighter ace from Slovakia during World War II. He accumulated 26 kills.

Gerthofer had joined the Czechoslovak Air Force in 1927 flying bombers. In 1939, he became a pilot in the Air Force of newly independent Slovakia. After completing training on Messerschmitt Bf 109 fighter aircraft in October 1942, he was appointed deputy commanding officer of 13 JG 52, the Slovak air contingent on the Eastern Front. In 175 sorties he shot down 26 Soviet aircraft.

In the Slovak National Uprising in August 1944, Gerthofer joined the insurgents, but was taken prisoner on 31 August and spent the rest of the war in Stalag XVIII-A.

After the war, Gerthofer served in the re–formed Czechoslovak Air Force before being discharged for political reasons in 1951.

== Bibliography ==
- Rajlich, Jiří; Boshniakov, Stephan; Mandjukov, Petko (2004). Slovakian and Bulgarian Aces of World War 2. Osprey Aircraft of the Aces. Vol. 58. Oxford: Osprey. pp. 66–67. ISBN 1841766526.
