= Sky Park (Bratislava) =

Skyscraper in Bratislava

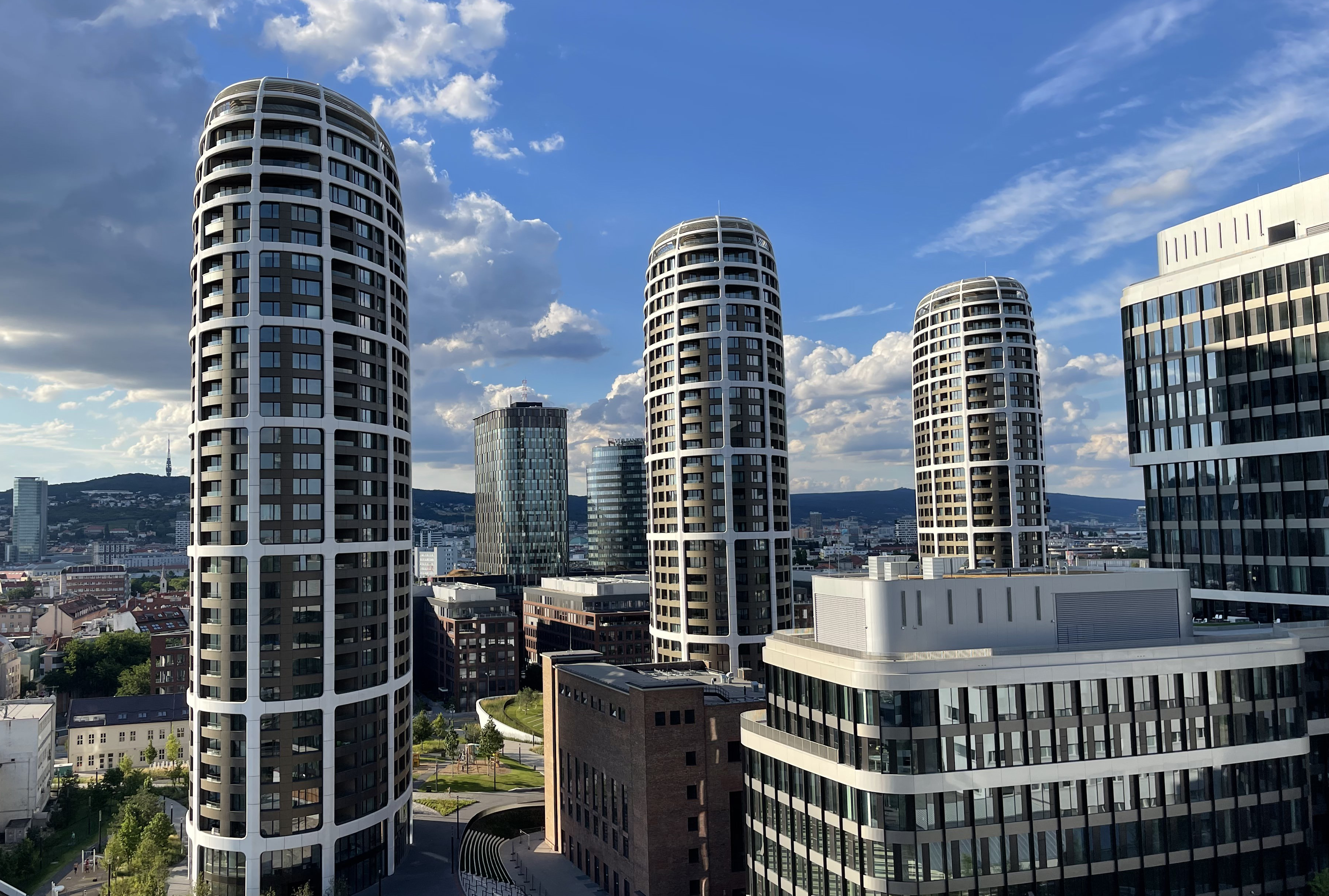
- Interactive map of the Sky Park area

General information
- Status: Under construction
- Type: Mixed-use
- Location: Old Town, Bratislava, Slovakia, Jurkovičova Tepláreň, 811 09 Bratislava
- Coordinates: 48.14371°N 17.12466°E
- Construction started: December 2016
- Completed: 2027
- Cost: €420 million (Sky Park I, II, III, Sky Park Offices) €13 million (Jurkovič Heating Plant)

Height
- Roof: 119 m (390 ft) (Sky Park Tower); 105 m (344 ft) (Sky Park I, II, III, IV); 79 m (259 ft) (Sky Park Offices)

Technical details
- Structural system: Concrete
- Floor count: 33 (Sky Park Tower); 31 (Sky Park I, II, III, IV); 18 (Sky Park Offices)
- Floor area: 135,800 m^{2} (1,460,000 sq ft)

Design and construction
- Architects: Zaha Hadid; Zaha Hadid Architects; Pantograph; GFI; Townshend Landscape Architects; Marko & placemakers Vietzke & Borstelmann Architekten
- Developer: Penta Real Estate (Sky Park I, II, III, Sky Park Offices, Jurkovič Heating Plant); Alto Real Estate (Sky Park IV, Sky Park Tower)

Website
- Sky Park Complex; Sky Park Residence; Sky Park Tower; Sky Park Offices; Sky Park Jurkovič Heating Plant

Sky Park is a premium mixed-use building complex under construction in Bratislava, Slovakia. It is composed of one main residential tower which is set to reach a height of 119 metres (390 ft) tall upon its completion in 2027, four identical lower-rise residential towers measuring 105 metres (355 ft) tall, one office tower measuring 79 metres (259 ft) tall and renovated National cultural monument Jurkovič Heating Plant by famous Slovak architect Dušan Jurkovič. All five residential towers housing 1,441 apartments.

== History ==
=== Architecture ===
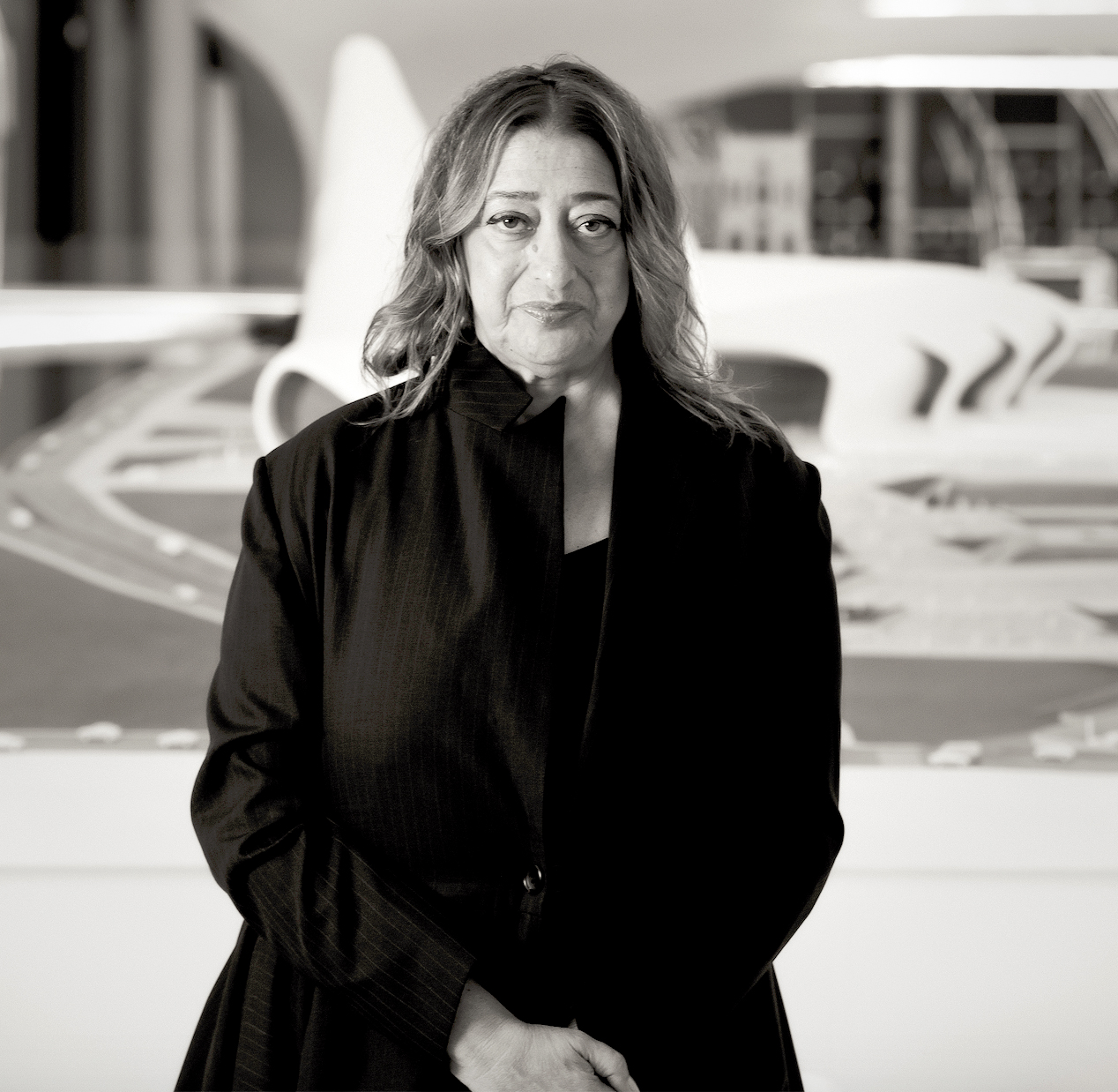
Zaha Hadid, the architect of Sky Park towers

The building complex is located on a former industrial site situated between the Čulenova, Bottova and Továrenská streets. The only formerly functional building of the site still standing in the present is the National cultural monument of the Jurkovič Heating Plant of the former Apollo Refinery which was renovated.

Although the project was presented in 2010, the construction on the project only began in December 2016. The first three residential towers were officially completed in 2020. The construction of the fourth residential tower started in 2021 and was completed in 2024. All four towers housing 1,048 apartments. The facade of the buildings is custom-mixed, warm and at the same time matte, concepted in slightly de-saturated bronze color with the depth and properties of a metallic surface.

The apartments in the buildings are individually designed so that every square meter is fully usable. The building complex includes a park with more than 35,000 m^{2} of greenery and it was designed by Zaha Hadid Architects and Townshend Landscape Architects in collaboration with Slovak architect Igor Marko. Sky Park Offices building was redesigned by Vietzke & Borstelmann Architekten.

Currently, the construction of the main fifth residential high-rise building called Sky Park Tower is underway. The main building with 393 apartments will have a different design, namely the appearance of two connected lower-rise buildings of the complex. During the creation of this building, the park will also be expanded. With expected completion in 2027, it will be the last posthumous completed project with direct involvement of Zaha Hadid before her death.

The Sky Park Office building represents the section part of the complex. It was designed by the architectural studio Vietzke & Borstelmann Architekten and was completed in 2021. The building has 18 floors, stands at 79 metres tall and disposes of 31,000 m^{2} of leasable area. The building meets the requirements of sustainability in accordance with the LEED Gold Certificate awarded in 2021 and also meets the requirements for a healthy working environment through the WELL Gold certification awarded the same year.

The construction of Sky Park Tower, Sky Park Residence, Sky Park Offices and the reconstruction of Jurkovič Heating Plant contributed to a significant revitalization of the original industrial area of the city which was hit by the bombing in 1944 during World War II.

== Buildings ==
Sky Park consisting of the following buildings:

Name	Image	Height m (ft)	Floors	Completion year	Ref.
Sky Park Tower		119 m (390 ft)	33	2027	
Sky Park Residence I		105 m (344 ft)	31	2020	
Sky Park Residence II		105 m (344 ft)	31	2020	
Sky Park Residence III		105 m (344 ft)	31	2020	
Sky Park Residence IV		105 m (344 ft)	31	2024	
Sky Park Offices		79 m (259 ft)	18	2021	
Jurkovič Heating Plant				2021	

== Gallery ==
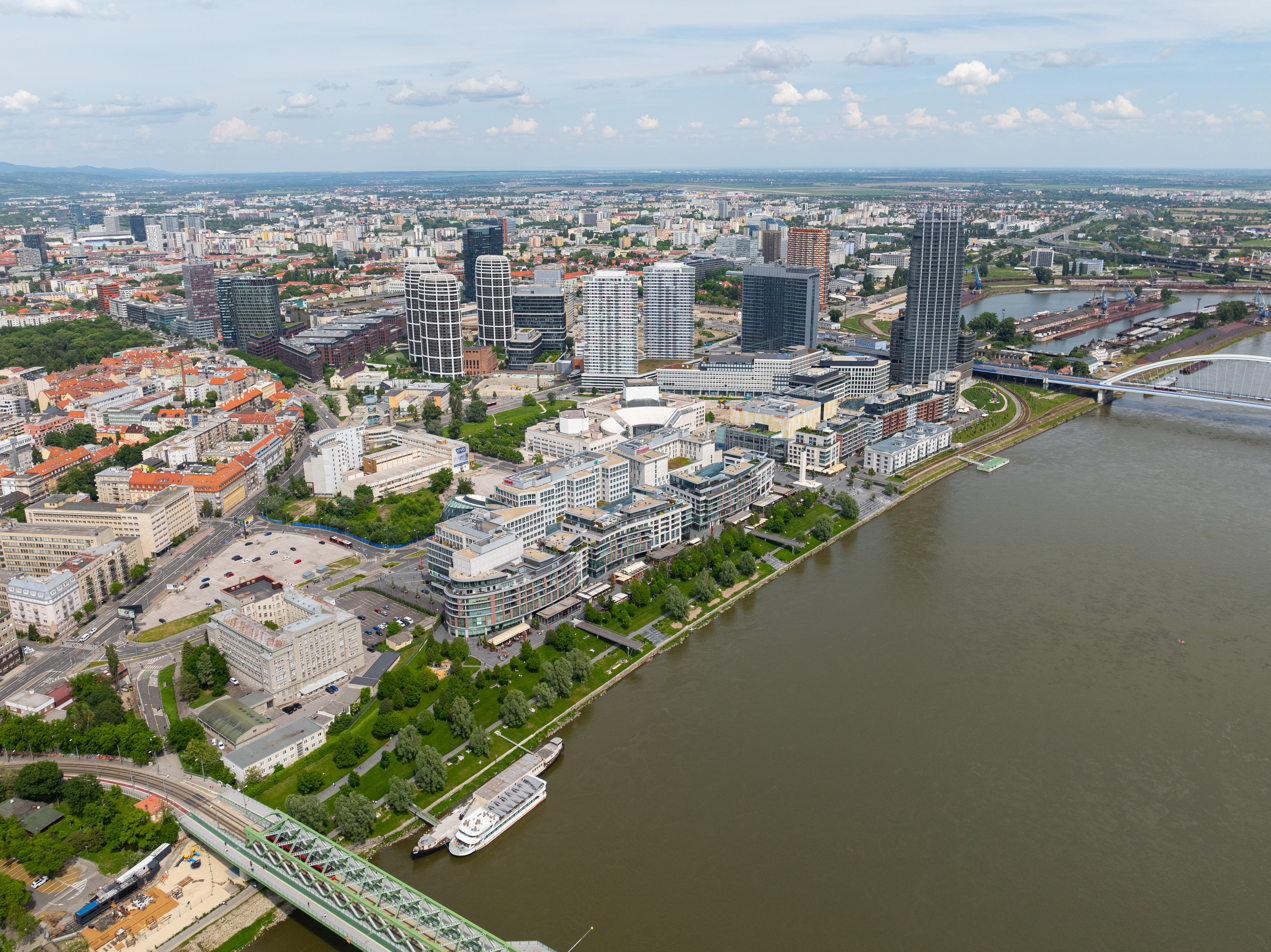
View of new Bratislava downtown with Sky Park (2024)

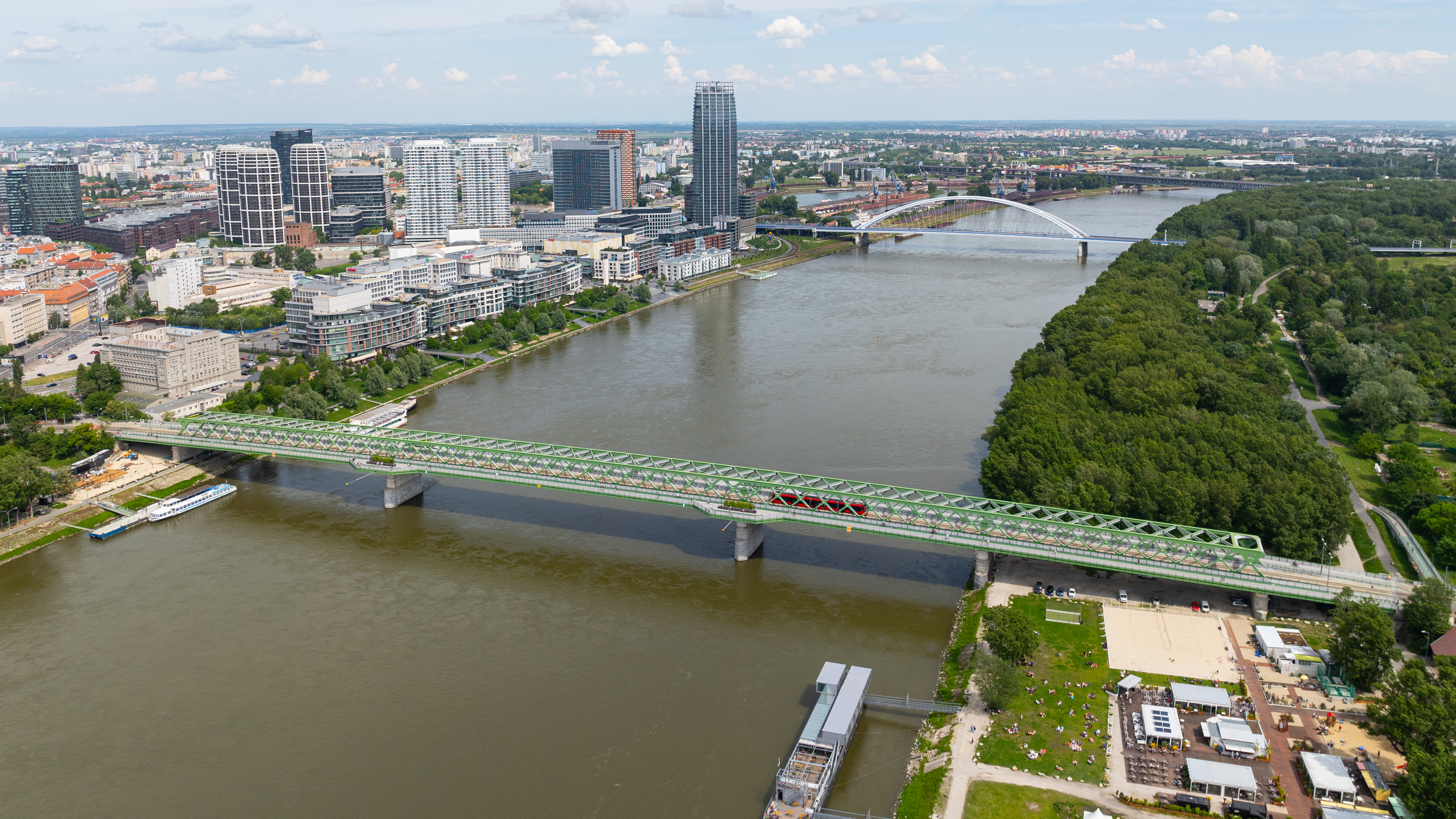
View of new Bratislava downtown with Sky Park (2024)

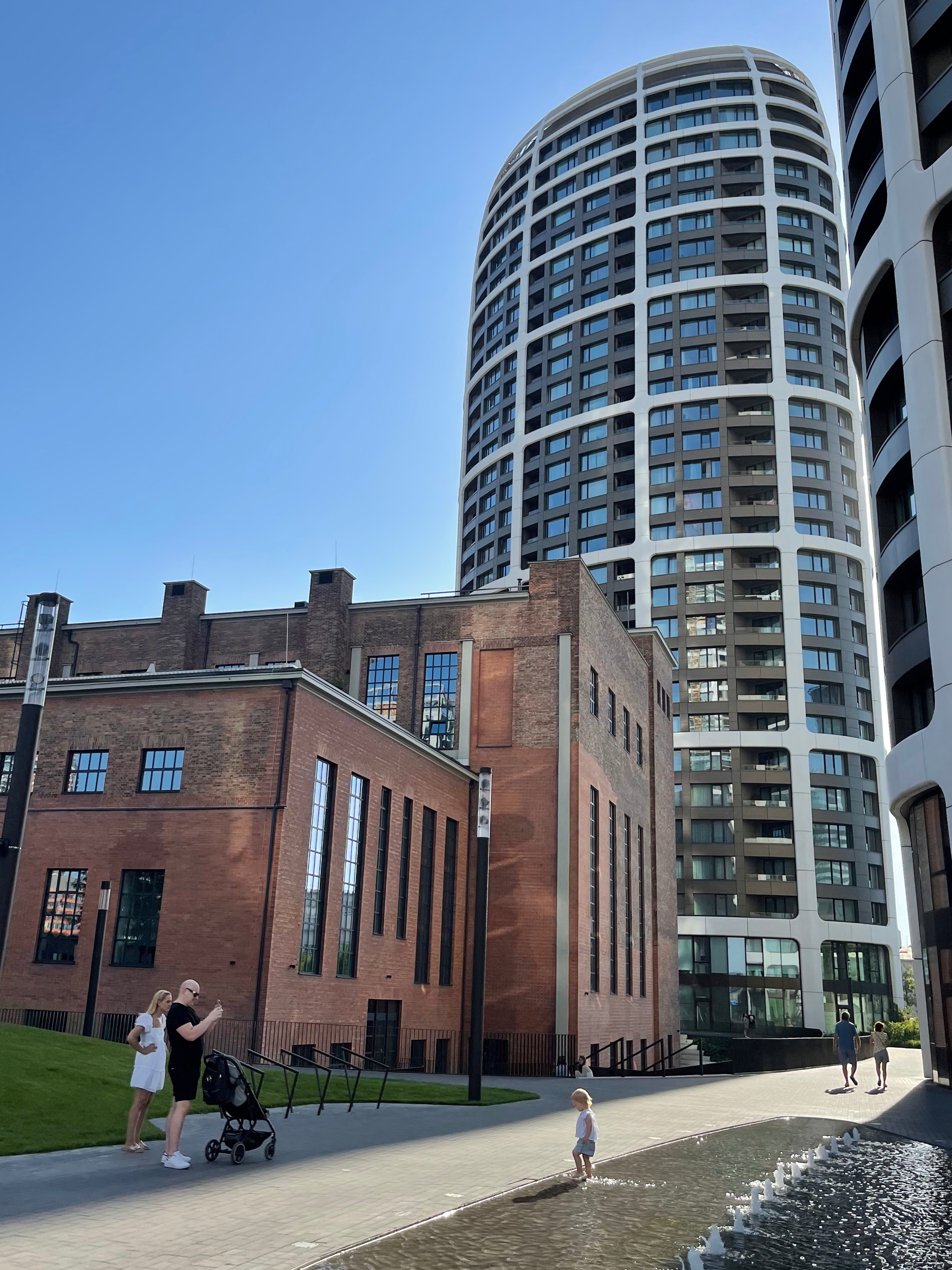
Sky Park residential tower and the Jurkovič Heating Plant

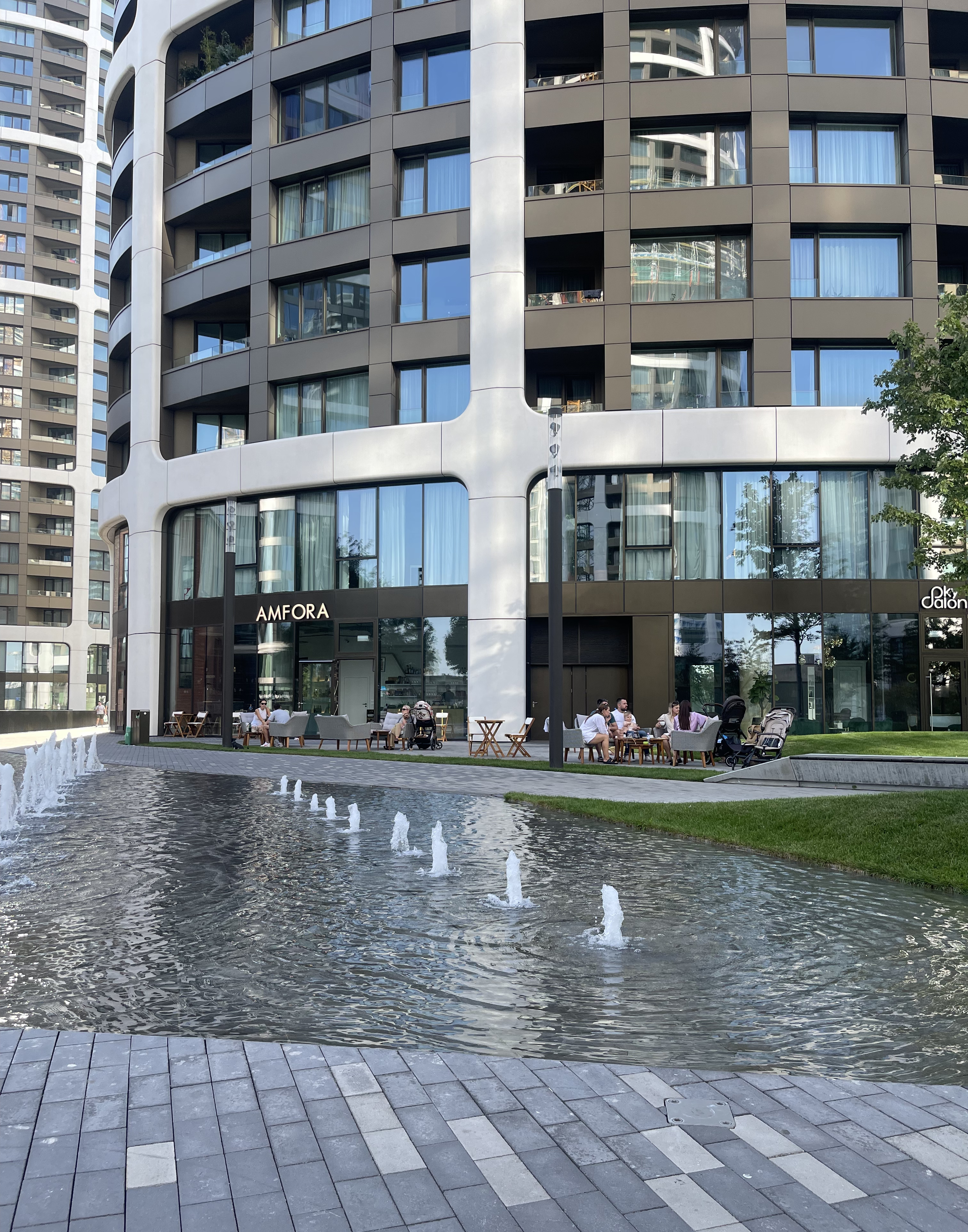
Fountain and café in Sky Park

== See also ==
- Eurovea City
- List of tallest buildings in Slovakia
- List of tallest buildings in Bratislava
- List of tallest residential buildings
