= Herbert Olbrich =

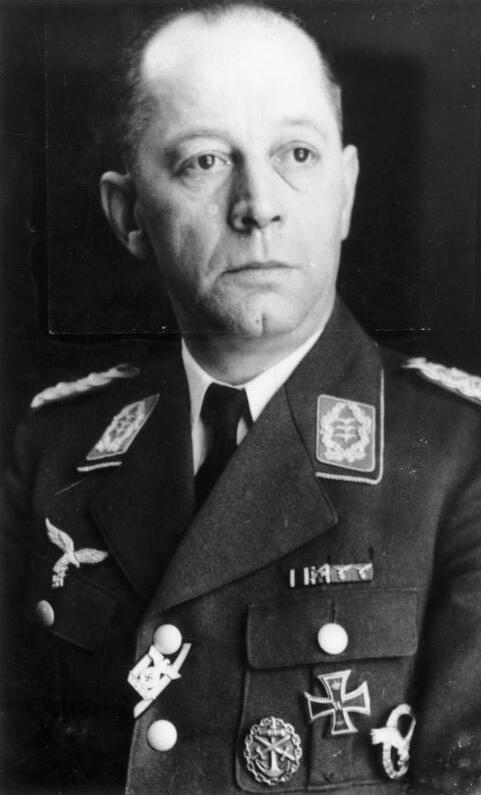
- Herbert Olbrich (1940)
- Born: 1 July 1897; Friedheim
- Died: 29 October 1976 (aged 79); München
- Military career
- Allegiance: German Empire; Nazi Germany
- Branch: German Army; Luftwaffe (1933–1945)
- Service years: 1933–1945 Nazi Germany
- Rank: Generalleutnant
- Commands: 13th Luftwaffe Field Division; 17th Luftwaffe Field Division
- Conflicts: World War I; World War II
- Awards: Slovak War Victory Cross Order

Herbert Olbrich (1 July 1897 in Friedheim – 29 October 1976 in München) was a Luftwaffe Generalleutnant during World War II, and a recipient of the Slovak Victory Cross Order. He was captured in Flensburg on 12 May 1945 and became a British prisoner of war between 12 May 1945 and 17 May 1948. On 9 January 1946, he was transferred to Island Farm Special Camp 11.
