= War Victory Cross =

Order of the War Victory Cross, 2nd class

The War Victory Cross order was a medal introduced by the Slovak Republic. The order was issued to Slovakian military personnel who had been in the armed forces for a minimum of four years. A total of 3,769 awards of all classes were made; of which 437 were to members of the German armed forces and 142 to those of Romania.

== History ==
The Order of the War Victory Cross, also known as the Slovak War Victory Cross, was one of the most important orders and decorations of the First Slovak Republic, awarded for personal gallantry in combat, but also for outstanding service to the country. Established on September 11, 1939, by President Jozef Tiso, this war decoration could also be awarded to foreign soldiers and military leaders. The War Victory Cross, last awarded in 1945, is sometimes confused with the Order of the Slovak Cross (Order of Hlinka), which was also awarded between 1939 and 1945.

All classes, including the later Grand Cross, could be awarded with swords. The medals of the 5th, 6th, and 7th classes bore the swords on the ring (linden wreath, or sometimes laurel wreath) between the decoration and the ribbon. Initially, a single recipient could be honored with all classes of the cross. The 6th and 7th classes were reserved exclusively for non-commissioned officers and enlisted men. The Order was discontinued in 1945. With the loss of independence and the annexation by Czechoslovakia in 1948, Slovaks were forbidden from wearing the Order.

=== Awards to Slovaks ===
Of the 3,139 awards given to Slovaks, 2,270 were bestowed on March 14, 1944, upon all soldiers who had served at least four years in the army of the Slovak Republic. This mass awarding led to criticism from Slovak officers, as it instantly diminished the prestige of the Order.

=== Awards to Foreigners ===
The decoration was awarded 630 times to foreigners (Romanians, Italians, Croatians, Japanese, Bulgarians, Finns), including 437 times to Germans.

== Classes ==
- 1st Class with star (exclusively for generals)
  - 37 mm wide coral-red neck ribbon with embroidered yellow linden leaves
  - eight-pointed silver star
- 1st Class without star
  - Grand Cross-worthy neck decoration (52 mm high, 36 mm wide), gold with linden leaf pattern, red enameled double cross (Patriarchal or Order Cross)
  - between the insignia and suspension ring, the State Eagle of the Republic with the State Coat of Arms – three hills with a Patriarchal Cross – is affixed for the 1st and 2nd Classes (later also for the Grand Cross)
- 2nd Class (primarily for generals) and Colonels)
  - Neck Order, silver is used instead of gold, the double cross is now enamelled in blue
  - 37 mm wide blue neck ribbon with two 3 mm wide coral-red stripes and embroidered yellow linden leaves
- 3rd Class (primarily lieutenant colonels and majors)
  - Bronze without rays, brown enamelled double cross, 36 mm red ribbon with state eagle and folk art ornaments (miniatures on embroidered ribbon) on the left and right

=== From 1941/1942 ===
- Grand Cross without and with swords
  - similar to the previous 1st Class with star, collar instead of neck ribbon; diagonal silver swords on the breast star
- 1st Class without and with swords
  - as the previous 1st Class, but with a new red neck ribbon with two yellow stripes; Silver swords run diagonally below the double cross
- 2nd Class with and without swords
  - Silver-plated instead of gilded, as with the new 1st Class, red enameled double cross; in black and white images, the distinction between 1st and 2nd Class is no longer discernible
- 3rd Class with and without swords
  - Pennant cross (left breast, similar to the Iron Cross 1st Class), blue enameled double cross, silver rays; gilded swords run diagonally below the double cross
- 4th Class with and without swords
  - Without swords, like the previous 3rd Class, also with a brown enameled double cross
  - With swords, with a matte white enameled double cross and swords in the eagle's talons
  - The ribbon of the 4th Class was available both with embroidered folk art ornaments and with only two horizontal yellow stripes
- 5th Class with and without swords
  - Ø 36 mm gilded medal, red ribbon with two yellow stripes; reverse: "ZA ZASLUHY" (for merit)
- 6th Class Class without and with swords
  - Silver-plated medal, red ribbon with two yellow stripes
- VII Class without and with swords
  - Bronze-colored medal, red ribbon with two yellow stripes

== Notable recipients (excerpt) ==
- Gheorghe Avramescu
- Gottlob Berger
- Walther von Brauchitsch
- Kurt Daluege
- Oskar Dirlewanger
- Karl Hermann Frank
- Ján Gerthofer
- Hermann Göring
- Franz Halder
- Herbert Olbrich
- Wilhelm Wetzel
