= Jurkovič Heating Plant =

Building in Slovakia

Jurkovičova Tepláreň
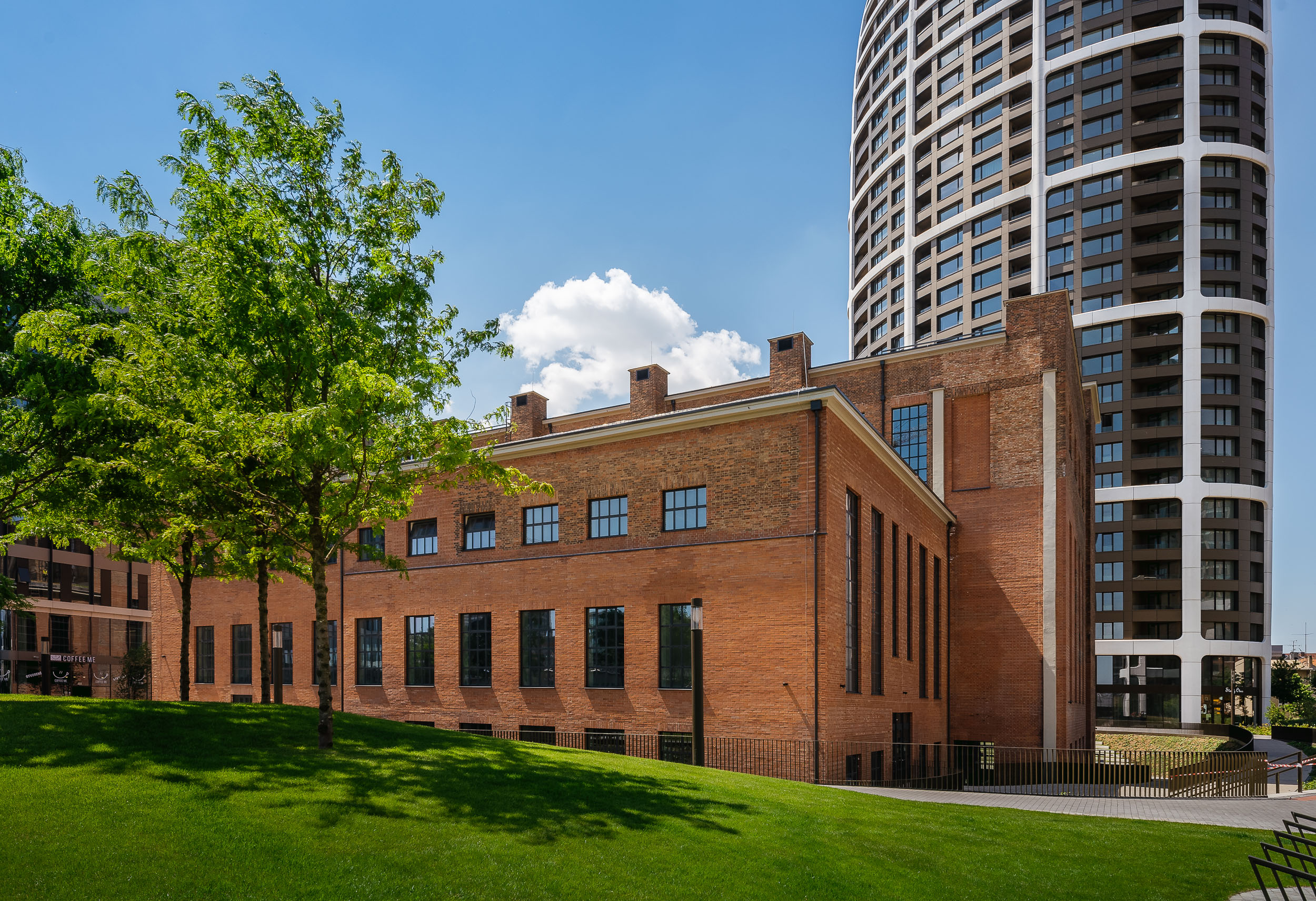
- Jurkovičova Tepláreň po rekonštrukcii

General information
- Architectural style: Functionalist
- Classification: Co-working center, café, restaurant, gallery
- Location: Old Town, Bratislava, Slovakia
- Coordinates: 48.1438°N 17.1257°E
- Completed: 1942
- Cost: €13 million (reconstruction)

Design and construction
- Architect(s): Dušan Jurkovič

Website
- Jurkovič Heating Plant

Jurkovič Heating Plant (Jurkovičova Tepláreň, originally known as Bratislava heating plant) is a reconstruction of an old functionalist building of Bratislava heating plant in the Old Town, which was designed by Dušan Jurkovič, as a part of the former industrial area of the city. Today, it houses BASE co-working center, a café, a restaurant and a gallery. It is part of Sky Park complex.

== History ==
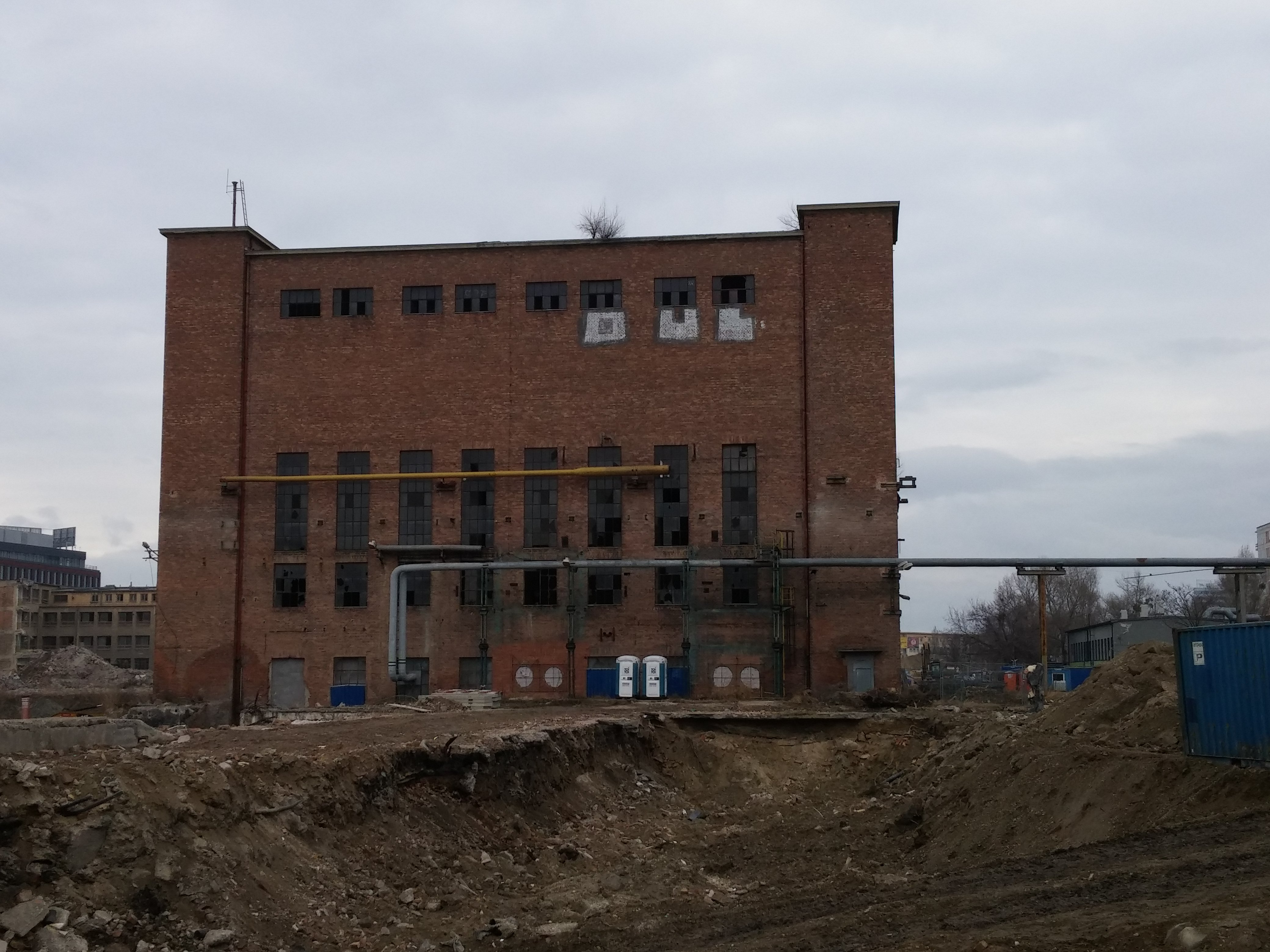
Jurkovičova Heating Plant before the reconstruction

Jurkovič Heating Plant was built in the former industrial area of Bratislava, in between Čulenova, Továrenská and Bottova streets. It was designed by a Slovak architect Dušan Jurkovič, who worked with Západoslovenské elektrárne (a Slovak electricity supply company) and is considered to be the founder of modern architecture in Slovakia. The heating plant complex was built after the war in the 1940s on the grounds of Apollo, a mineral oil refinery. It was built gradually, in accordance with the ever-changing technological and architectural trends. The building of the heating plant itself represents the oldest part of the entire complex. The process of its construction began in 1941 and was completed in 1942, altogether with the boiler room and the turbine hall.

On June 16, 1944, American bombers attacked the Apollo Refinery as well as the Winter Harbor and the Danube Bridge in Bratislava. The building of the heating plant was also partially hit and damaged by the bombing.

Up until the 1970s, there were several additions to the area: two new turbine halls were constructed as well as water systems, a transformer station, a second boiler room with a distribution point and a control station, circulating pumps and oil management systems. The chimney became a dominant feature of the area.

Its operation was held back at the end of the 20th century. Consequently, the building fell into disrepair for several years.

On April 23, 2008, the building was recognized as a National Cultural Monument because of its architectural qualities (ÚZPF number 11561/2).

== Reconstruction ==
In 2018, Penta Real Estate obtained a permit to revitalize Jurkovič Heating Plant which received its occupancy certificate again in 2021. The reconstruction of the building was designed to preserve the original parts of the monument such as: the roof structure, a restored crane installed in the area, nationally protected coal hoppers or original brick walls. Exactly 31,736 bricks from the original facade were saved, many of which were later used in the reconstructed interior of the building.

The building found a new purpose after it has been revitalized. Now, it houses a café, a gallery and a restaurant. It is also home to BASE flexible office center.

The authors of the reconstruction

- author of the renovation of the building envelope: Pamarch, spol. Ltd.
- authors of the interior conversion: Architect Martin Paško and the team of DF Creative Group, spol. Ltd.
- authors of the interior design of the flexible office center: Architects Ján Antal, Martin Stára and the Studio Perspektiv s.r.o.

== Sky Park ==
The construction of Sky Park Tower, Sky Park Residence, Sky Park Offices and the reconstruction of Jurkovič Heating Plant contributed to a significant revitalization of the original industrial area of the city which was hit by the bombing in 1944 during World War II.

Sky Park Residence consists of four residential towers, three of which are already completed. The towers were designed by the architect Zaha Hadid and at the same time became one of her last projects before her death in 2016. The building of Sky Park Offices, designed by Vietzke & Borstelmann Architekten, was completed in 2021. The complex also contains a park with more than 35,000 m (115,000 ft) of greenery which was designed by Igor Marko in cooperation with Townshend Landscape Architects.

== External references ==
- Jurkovič Heating Plant on Sky Park web.
