= Bombing of Bratislava in World War II =

1944–45 US bombing campaign in Slovakia

Bombing of Bratislava
- Part of Oil Campaign of World War II and Strategic bombing during World War II
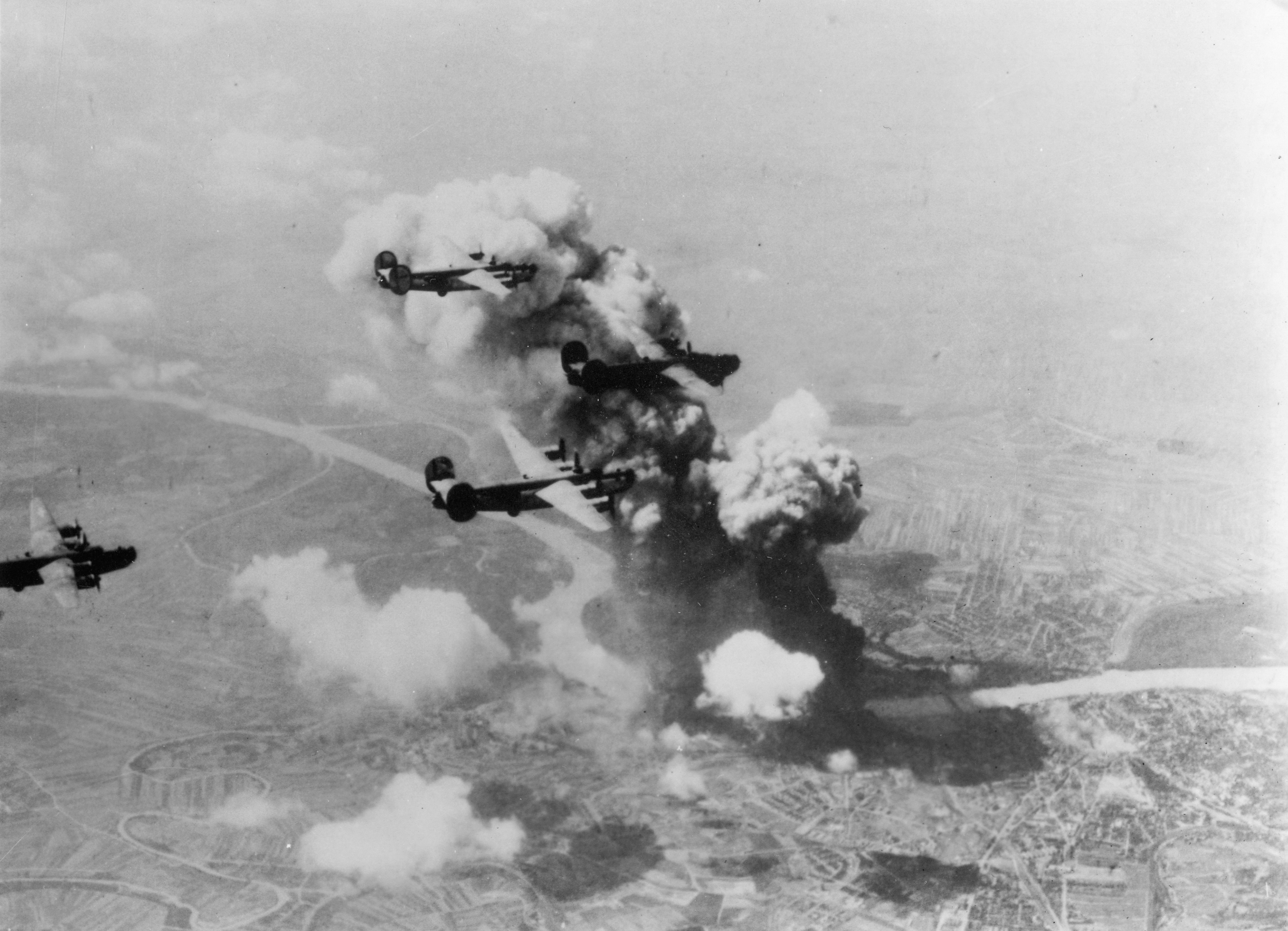
- 15th Air Force B-24s attacking the Apollo oil refinery, June 16, 1944
Date	16 June 1944 – 26 March 1945
Location	Bratislava, Slovak Republic 48°08′38″N 17°07′36″E
Result	Allied victory

Belligerents
United States; Soviet Union	Slovakia; Germany; Hungary

Commanders and leaders
(United States) Nathan Twining (Soviet Union) Sergei Goryunov	(Slovak Republic (1939–1945)) Ferdinand Čatloš (Nazi Germany) Hermann Höfle (Nazi Germany) Conrad von Ohlen (Nazi Germany) Richard Reimann (Kingdom of Hungary (1920–1946)) Aladár Heppes

Units involved
(United States) USAAF 15th Air Force; Aircraft: B-17 Flying Fortress; B-24 Liberator; P-38 Lightning; P-51 Mustang; (Soviet Union) Soviet 5th Air Army; Aircraft: B-25 Mitchell; Petlyakov Pe-2; Ilyushin Il-2	(Slovak Republic (1939–1945)) Slovak Air Force; 13 JG 52 (13. Staffel); Pohotovostná letka; Aircraft: Messerschmitt Bf 109G-6; Avia B-534; (Nazi Germany) Luftwaffe; Jagdgeschwader 27; Jagdgeschwader 300; Anti-aircraft forces: 18th Flak Division; Aircraft: Messerschmitt Bf 109G; Focke-Wulf Fw 190A; Messerschmitt Me 410; Messerschmitt Bf 110G; Junkers Ju 88C; (Kingdom of Hungary) Royal Hungarian Air Force; 101st Home Air Defence Fighter Wing; Aircraft: Messerschmitt Bf 109G-6

Casualties and losses
2 aircraft destroyed, 12–20 airmen captured or killed	300–770 civilians killed, 80% of Apollo refinery destroyed, Main Railway Station, Winter Harbor, Vajnory Airport, Slovak National Museum, gasworks and railway bridges damaged

The bombing of Bratislava (principally the bombing of the Apollo refinery) was a series of air raids conducted by the United States Army Air Forces (USAAF) during World War II. The most significant attack occurred on June 16, 1944, marking the first major Allied strike against the territory of the wartime Slovak Republic, a client state of Nazi Germany and an Axis state.

== Background ==
By 1944, the Allied powers had achieved definitive air superiority over the European theater, allowing for deep-penetration strategic bombing missions into the heart of Axis territory. Operating from recently captured airfields in Foggia, Italy, the 15th Air Force launched a coordinated and systematic campaign designed to dismantle the German "oil machine" — the vast network of refineries, synthetic oil plants, and storage depots that fueled the Wehrmacht's mechanized divisions and the Luftwaffe.

Bratislava, the capital of the (First) Slovak Republic, had emerged as a vital industrial node within this network. The city's strategic importance centered on the Apollo refinery, affectionately known by locals as Apolka. This facility was one of the most significant industrial assets in Central Europe, responsible for producing approximately 1.3% of the German Reich's total fuel supply.

The refinery's output was essential to the Axis war effort, providing a steady flow of high-grade gasoline, kerosene, and specialized engine oils. Because Bratislava was located deep within the continent, it was initially considered out of reach for Allied heavy bombers; however, the expansion of Allied operations into the Mediterranean placed the city directly within the crosshairs of the American long-range bombardment groups.

== USAAF Air Raids ==
=== The Raid of June 16, 1944 ===
At approximately 10:11 AM, the first wave of American bombers appeared over the city. A total of 158 B-24 Liberator bombers from the 376th, 449th, 450th, and 98th bombardment groups dropped nearly 370 tonnes of bombs.

The primary objectives of the air raid included the Apollo refinery, the Winter Harbor (Zimný prístav), and the Štefánik railway bridge. While casualty estimates vary, most historians agree that between 300 and 770 people were killed. A significant number of these victims were refinery workers who perished when their air-raid shelters were engulfed by burning oil. The strike resulted in the destruction of 80% of the refinery and caused extensive damage to residential areas, the Slovak National Museum, and the city's gasworks.

Many residents had ignored air-raid sirens, believing the planes were merely passing through to target Vienna. The high civilian death toll had a lasting impact on the population. The bombings effectively crippled the Slovak economy's ability to support the German war effort.

=== Subsequent Raids ===
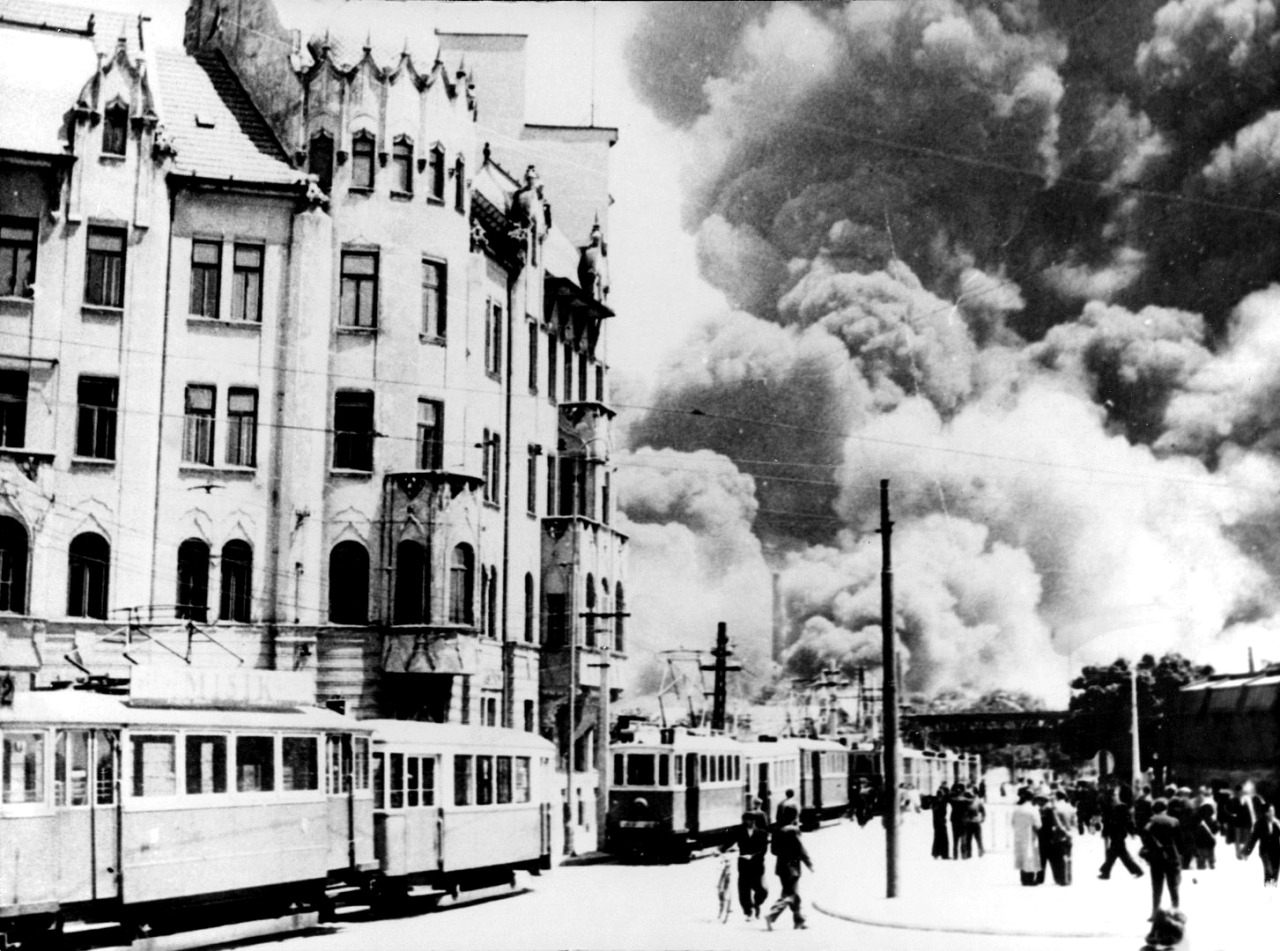
Smoke rising from the Apollo refinery after the raid on 16 June 1944

While the bombardment of June 16, 1944, caused the most significant industrial damage and loss of life, Bratislava remained a strategic target for Allied air forces until the final weeks of the conflict. As the Eastern Front advanced toward the Slovak borders, the city's role as a major communication and logistics hub necessitated further strikes by the USAAF.

Following the destruction of the Apollo refinery, subsequent missions targeted the city's transportation infrastructure to impede the movement of German military assets. In contrast to the heavy losses at the Apollo refinery, subsequent raids resulted in few civilian casualties.

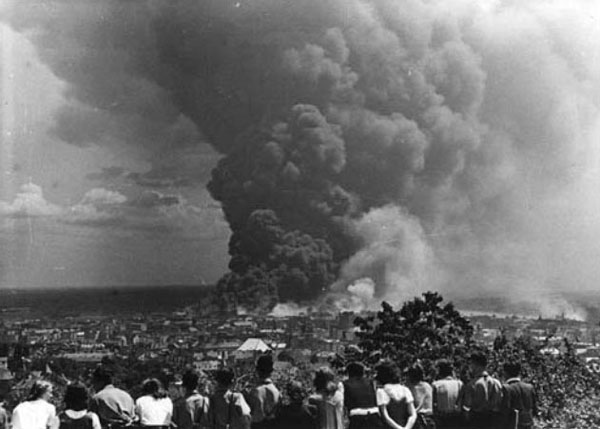
Thick clouds of soot rise above the city after American aircraft targeted the Apollo refinery, June 16, 1944

- September 20, 1944: Allied bombers from the 449th, 455th, 456th, 376th, and 98th bombardment groups targeted the Vajnory Airport and associated railway infrastructure. This raid occurred during the Slovak National Uprising, aiming to disrupt the German military's ability to deploy airborne reinforcements against insurgent forces.
- October 14, 1944: This operation focused on secondary transport hubs and marshalling yards. The objective was to extend the "transportation interdiction" campaign, limiting the capacity of the Axis powers to move heavy equipment and fuel toward the front lines. Originally tasked with hitting the Odertal oil refinery in Germany, the 461st Bombardment Group diverted to Bratislava due to heavy cloud cover. The 2nd Bombardment Group (flying B-17 Flying Fortress) also contributed to this mission, targeting the marshalling yards and the Štefánik Bridge.
- December 6, 1944: One of the most intensive late-war raids, the 465th Bombardment Group targeted the Main Railway Station and its surrounding districts. Due to the proximity of residential areas to the rail lines, this mission resulted in substantial damage to civilian neighborhoods and municipal infrastructure. The 464th Bombardment Group arrived late due to a takeoff accident and finding the primary target obscured by smoke and clouds, diverted to the nearby Devínska Nová Ves marshalling yards.
- February 7, 1945: As part of a massive 680-bomber offensive across Central Europe, a formation of 17 B-24 Liberators from the 451st Bombardment Group struck the Winter Harbor. Although the resulting damage was largely confined to railway sidings and freight cars, the mission was strategically significant in maintaining relentless pressure on Axis logistical networks as the Red Army approached from the east.
- March 26, 1945: Occurring just ten days before the city's liberation by the Red Army, this was the final major Allied raid on Bratislava. The strike from the 465th Bombardment Group was intended to paralyze the retreating German administration and prevent the establishment of a defensive perimeter within the city limits.

== Soviet Air Raids ==
Although the massive daylight raids by the USAAF remain the most prominent aerial operations in Bratislava’s wartime history, the city was a target for both Western and Eastern air powers. Beyond the strategic, long-range missions launched by American B-24s and B-17s from Italian bases, the Soviet Air Force (VVS) also carried out critical tactical strikes as the Red Army advanced from the east.

This dual-front aerial campaign ensured that Bratislava’s industrial and logistical importance to the Axis powers was systematically dismantled from both high-altitude strategic perspectives and direct frontline tactical support.

- February 21–22, 1945: In preparation for the final ground assault, the Soviet Air Force conducted intensive tactical raids over two consecutive days. These missions were primarily carried out by the 14th, 238th, and 251st Guards Regiments of the 15th Guards Bomber Aviation Division, operating under the 5th Air Army. On the night of February 21, Soviet crews flying B-25 Mitchell bombers targeted the Main Railway Station and the city center from high altitude. This was followed by a second wave on the evening of February 22, during which 45 bombers dropped 65 tons of explosives on the Vajnory Airport and the Kutuzovova barracks. While these strikes were designed to soften German defensive positions for the approaching 2nd Ukrainian Front, they also caused significant damage to the city’s municipal districts.

== Impact and Legacy ==
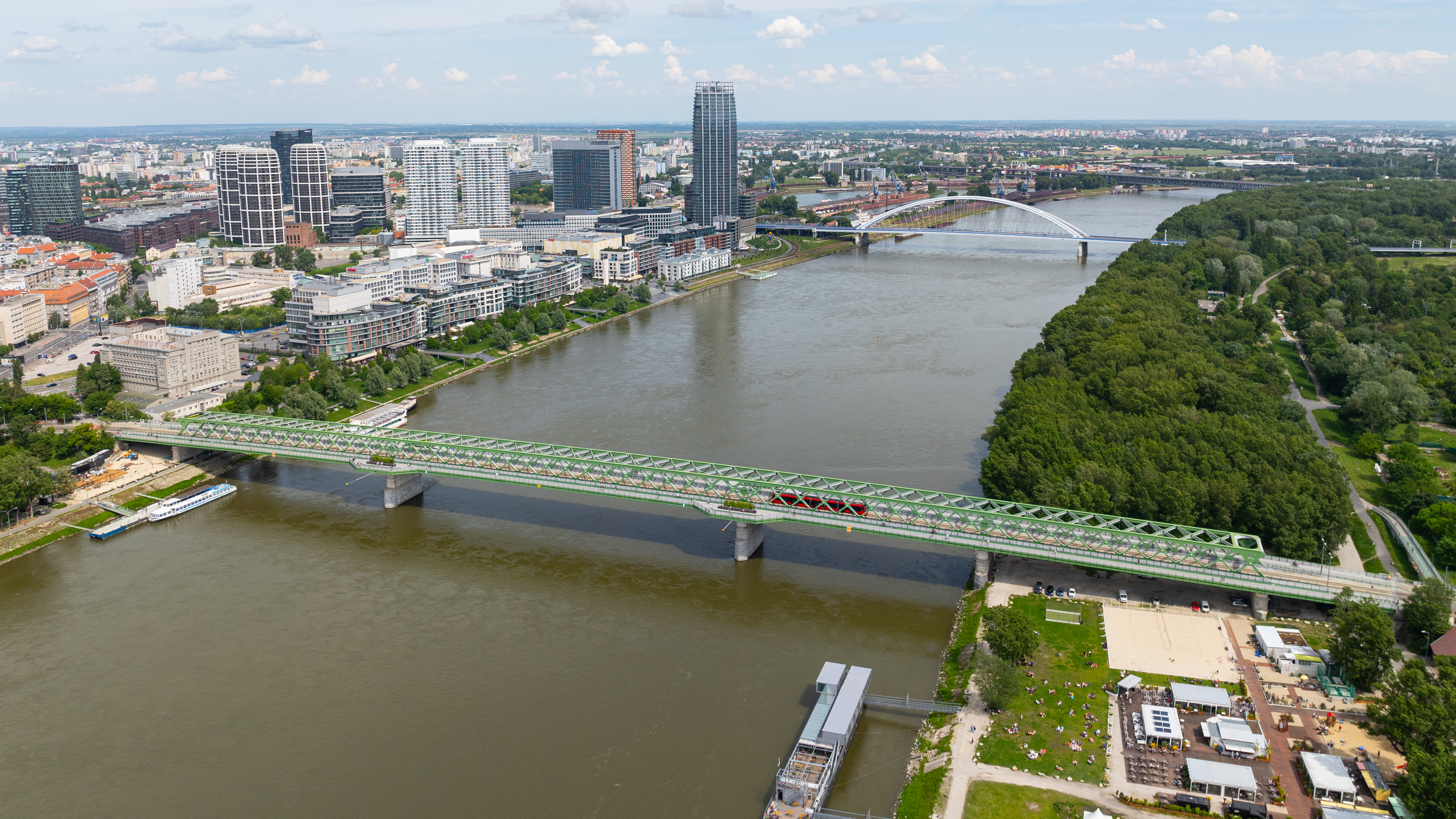
The glass towers of modern Bratislava now stand on the very ground where the Apollo refinery once burned

The cumulative effect of these raids was the near-total disruption of Bratislava's industrial and logistical capabilities. By the time the Red Army and supporting Romanian units reached the city outskirts, the German garrison's ability to utilize rail and air transport had been effectively neutralized.

Bratislava was liberated on April 4, 1945, ending the period of aerial bombardment. Historical assessments note that while the raids were successful in their strategic objectives, they left a significant portion of the city's transport and industrial sectors in ruins, requiring decades of post-war reconstruction.

Following the war, the remnants of the Apollo refinery were nationalized in 1946. In 1949, the state enterprise was renamed Slovnaft, which remains the direct legal and industrial successor to the original Apollo company. While the company eventually moved its primary refining operations to the larger Vlčie hrdlo site on the outskirts of the city in 1963, the original Apollo site was used for auxiliary production for several decades before being cleared.

Today, the site of the original refinery is occupied by the Apollo Bridge (Most Apollo), named in memory of the factory. Unexploded ordnance from these raids is still occasionally discovered during construction projects in the city.

== Gallery ==
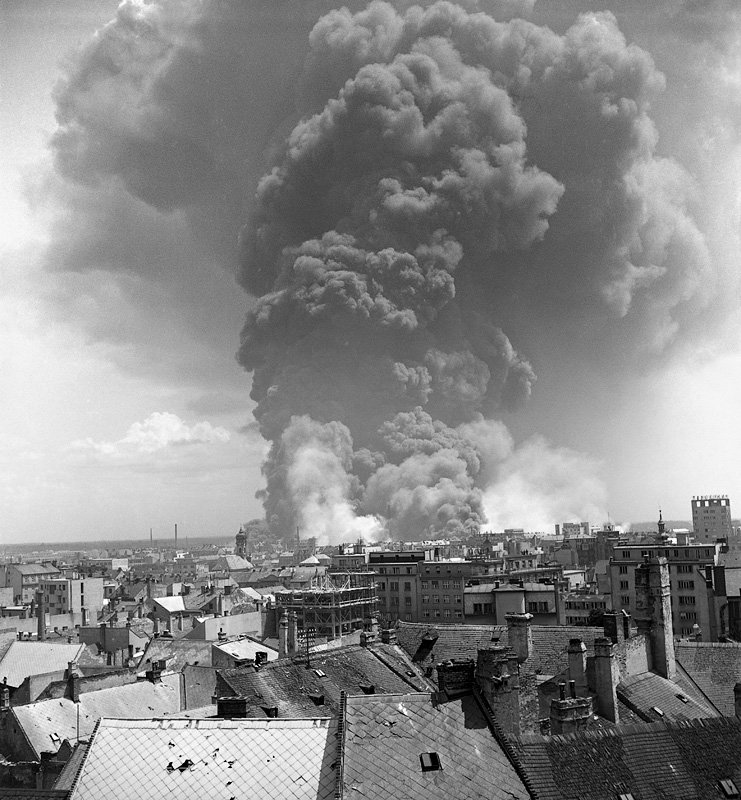
Smoke rising from the Apollo refinery, June 16, 1944

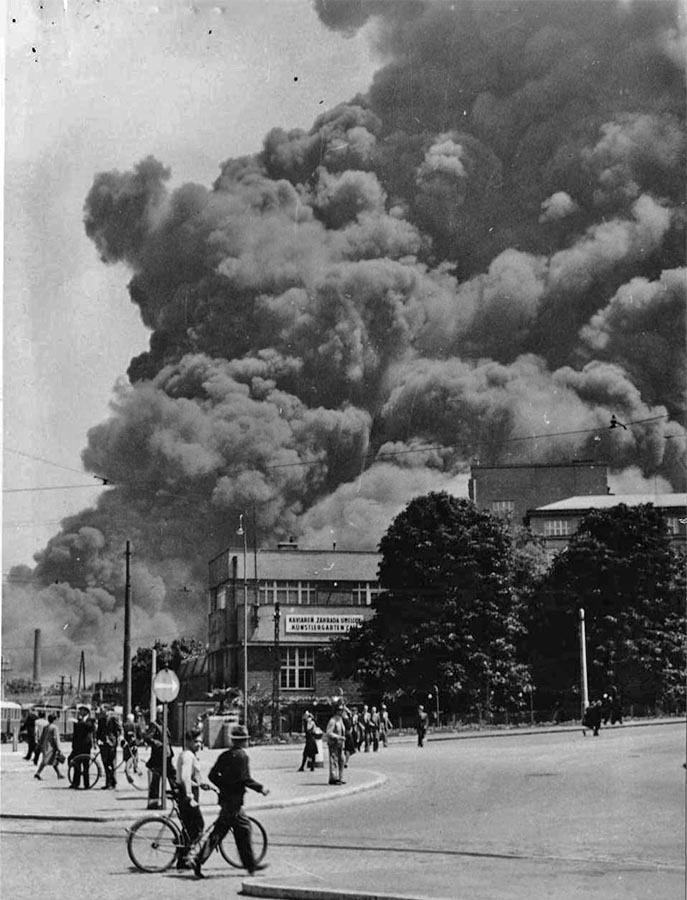
Bombing of Bratislava, June 16, 1944

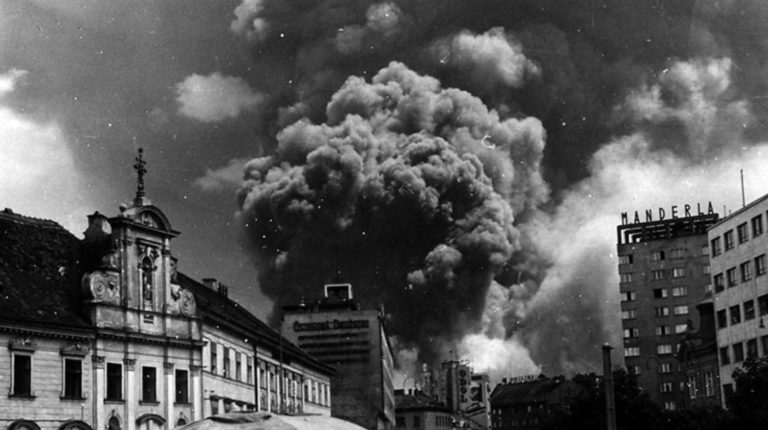
Bombing of Bratislava, June 16, 1944

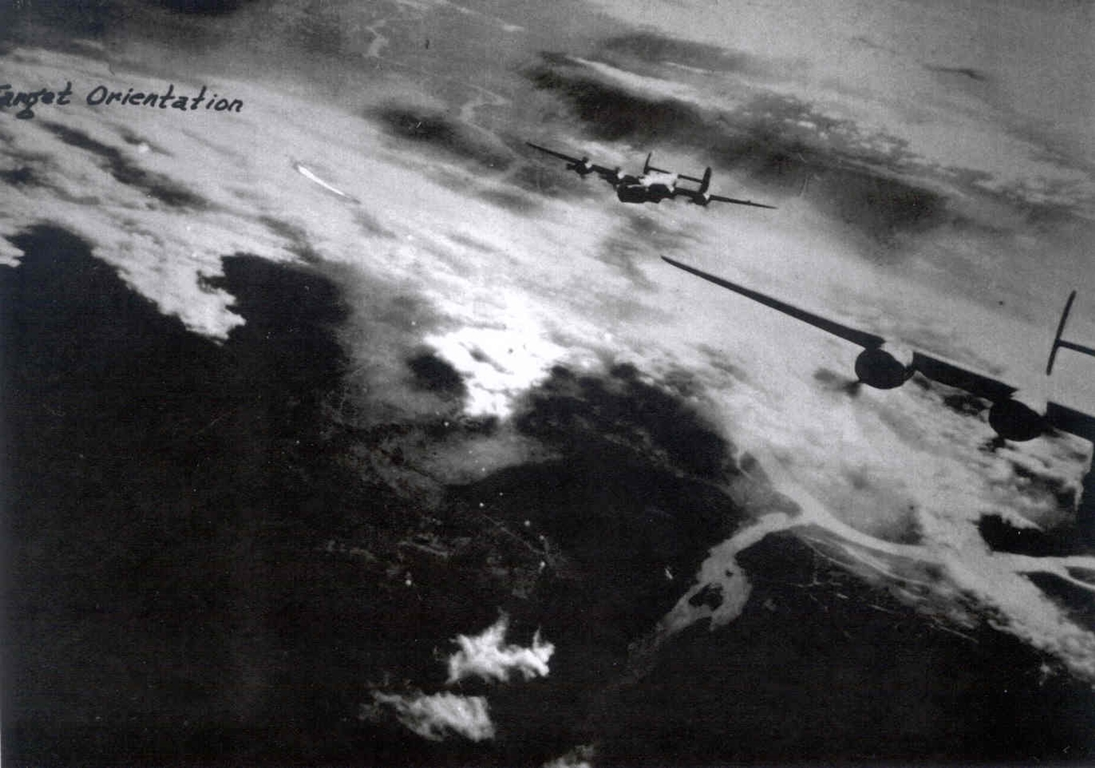
B-24 Liberators over Slovakia, December 6, 1944

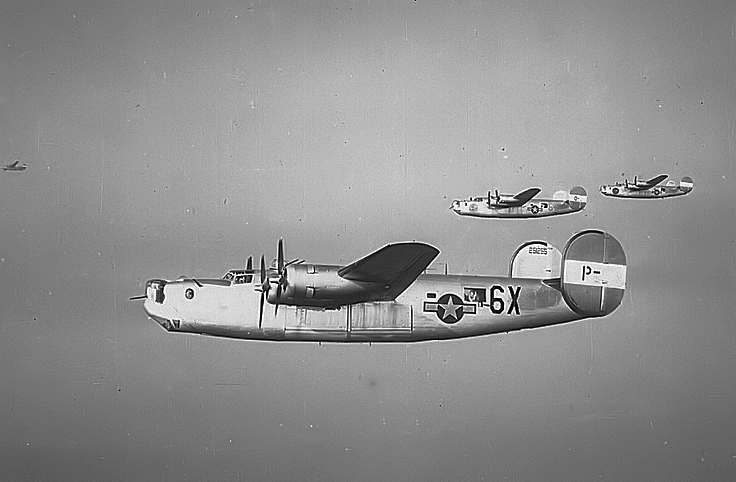
Consolidated B-24 Liberators in formation

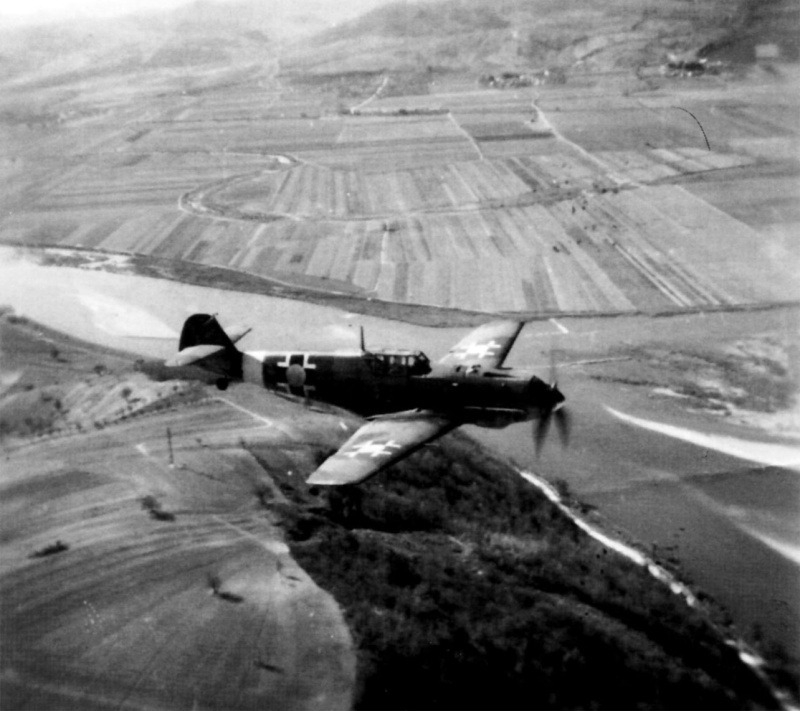
Messerschmitt Bf 109E of the Slovak Air Force

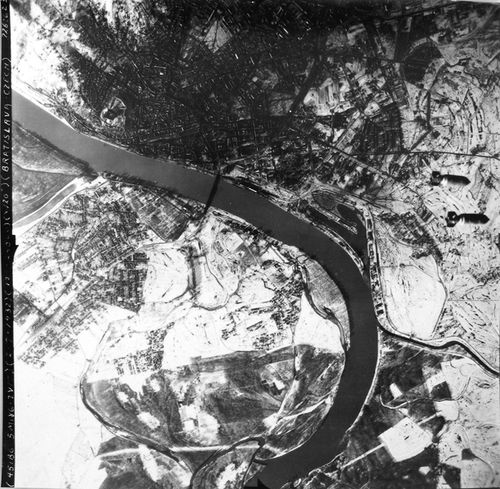
Photograph taken during the attack on Bratislava from the deck of a B-24 bomber

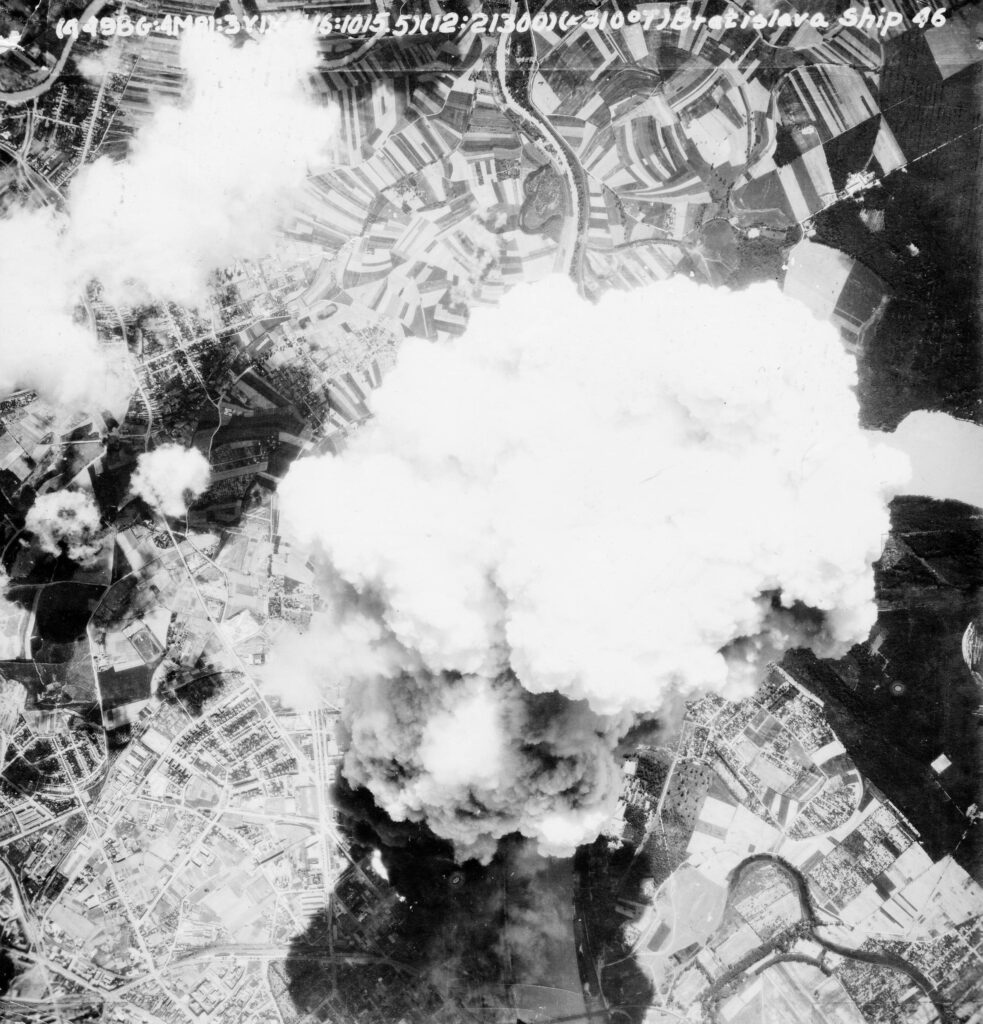
Photograph taken during the attack on Bratislava from the deck of a B-24 bomber

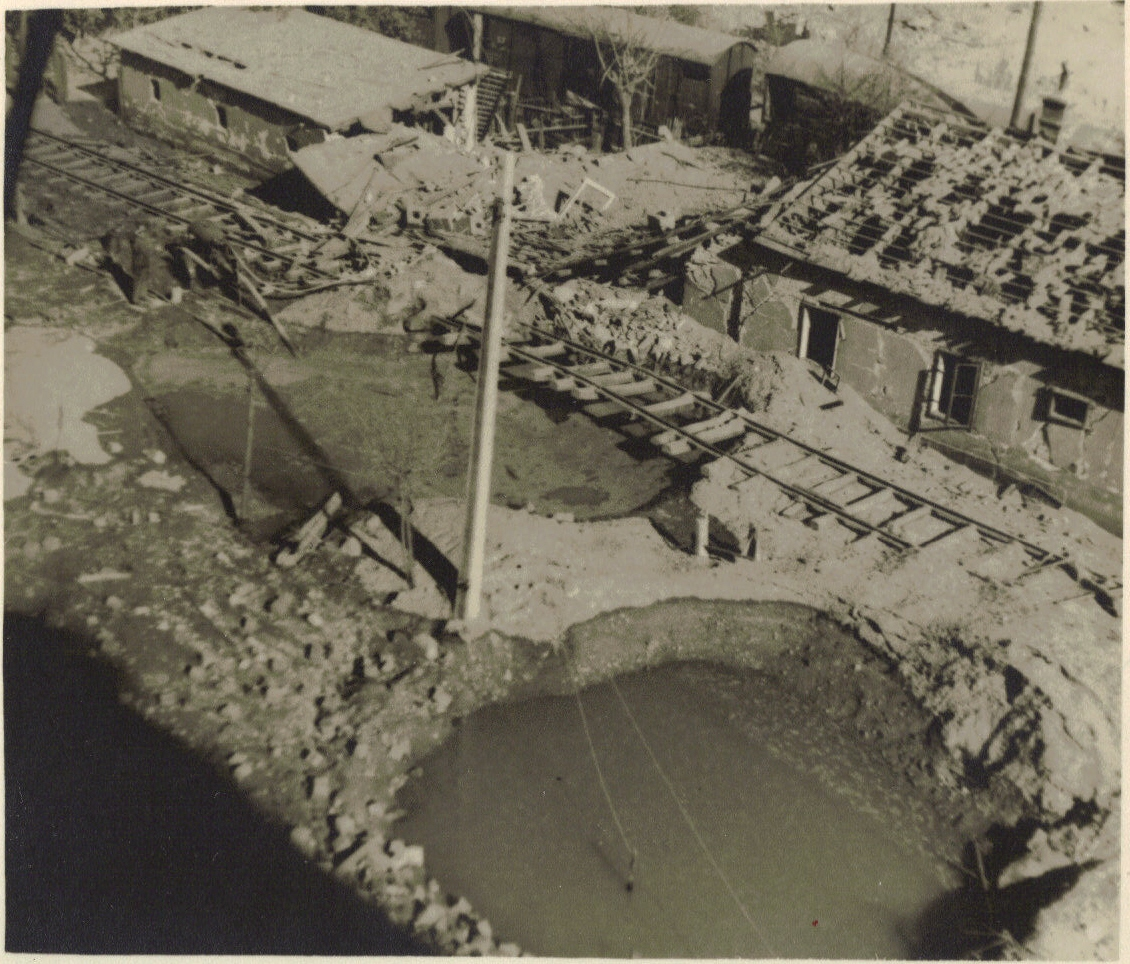
Bombing damage, September 1944

== See also ==
- Slovak Republic (1939–1945)
- Slovakia during World War II
- The Holocaust in Slovakia
- Slovak National Uprising
- Axis powers
- Czechoslovak government-in-exile
- Protectorate of Bohemia and Moravia
- Occupation of Czechoslovakia (1938–1945)
- Croatian–Romanian–Slovak friendship proclamation
