= Slovnaft =

Slovak oil refining company

Slovnaft a.s.
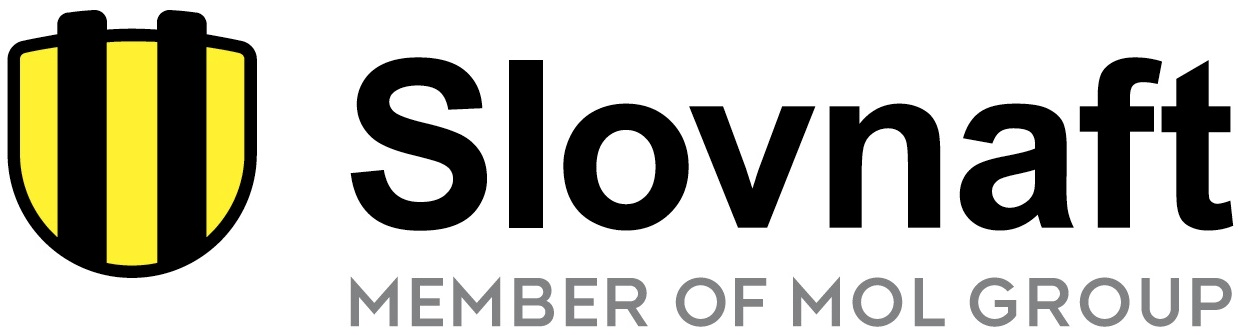

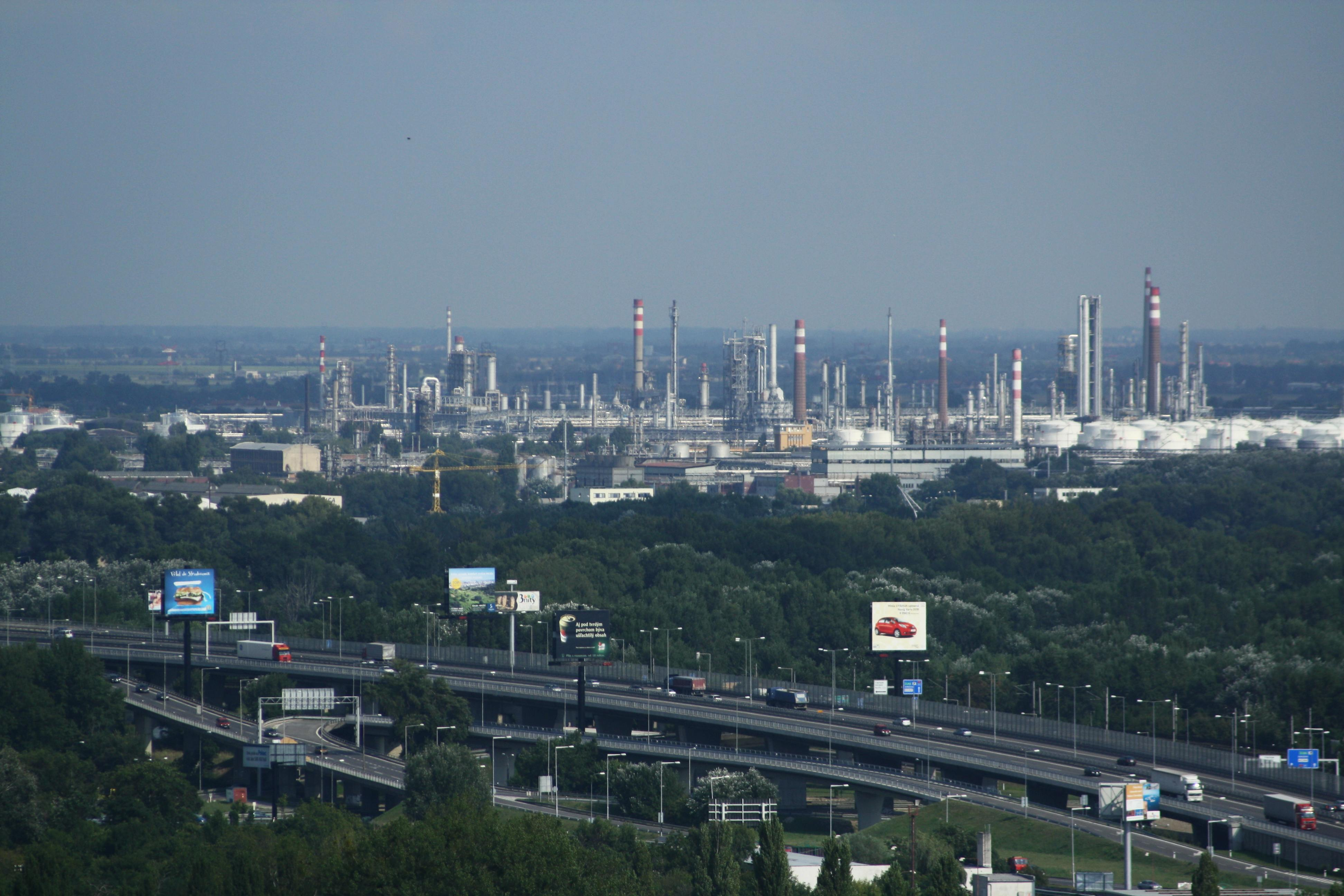
- Company type: Public
- Industry: Oil and gas industry
- Founded: 1949
- Headquarters: Bratislava, Slovakia
- Key people: Oszkár Világi (CEO)
- Products: Petrol; Diesel fuel Bitumen
- Services: Filling station Oil refinery
- Revenue: 3,798,000,000 euro (2018)
- Net income: 106,200,000 euro (2018)
- Number of employees: ~3,700
- Parent: MOL Group
- Website: www.slovnaft.sk

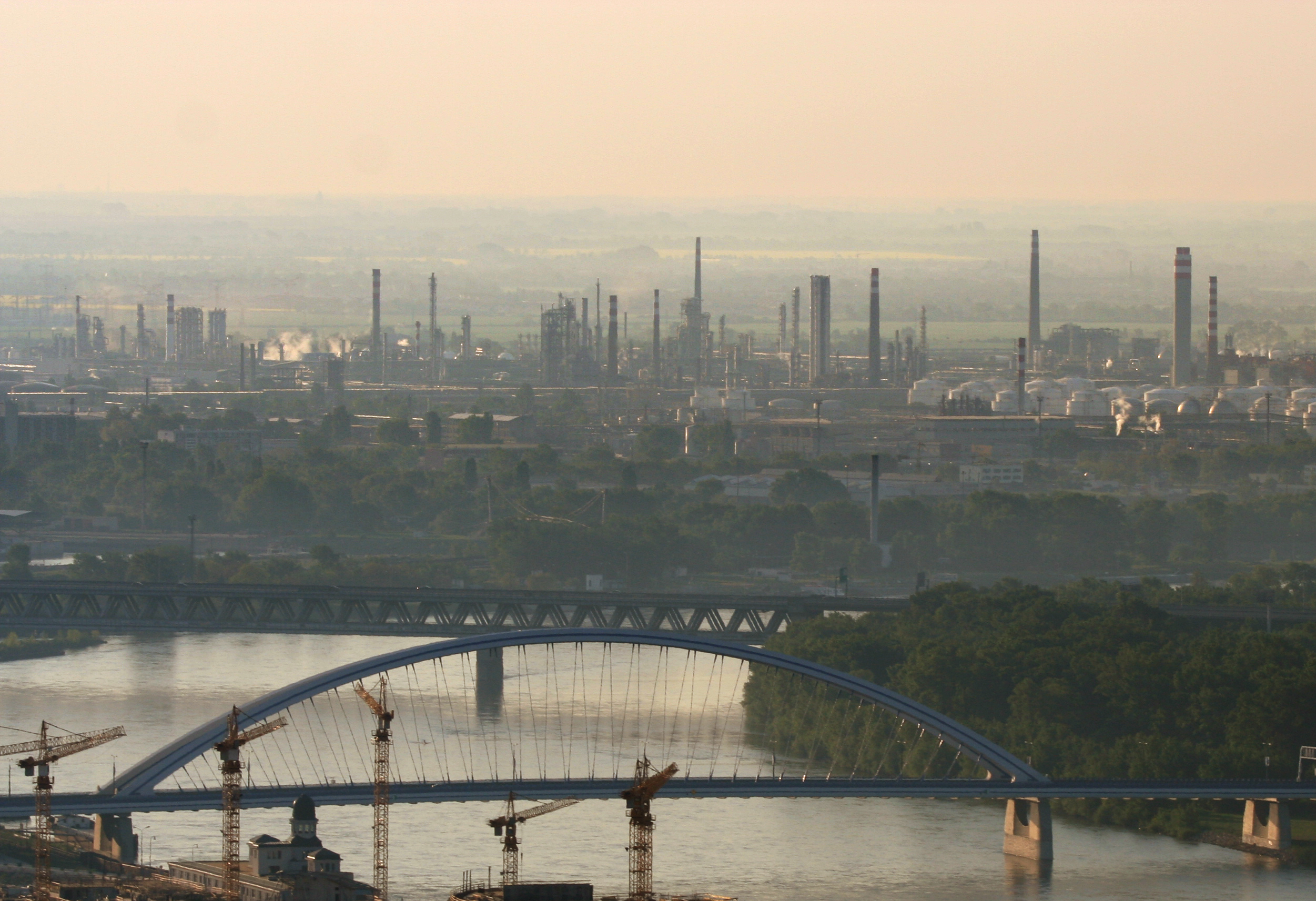
Slovnaft with bridges

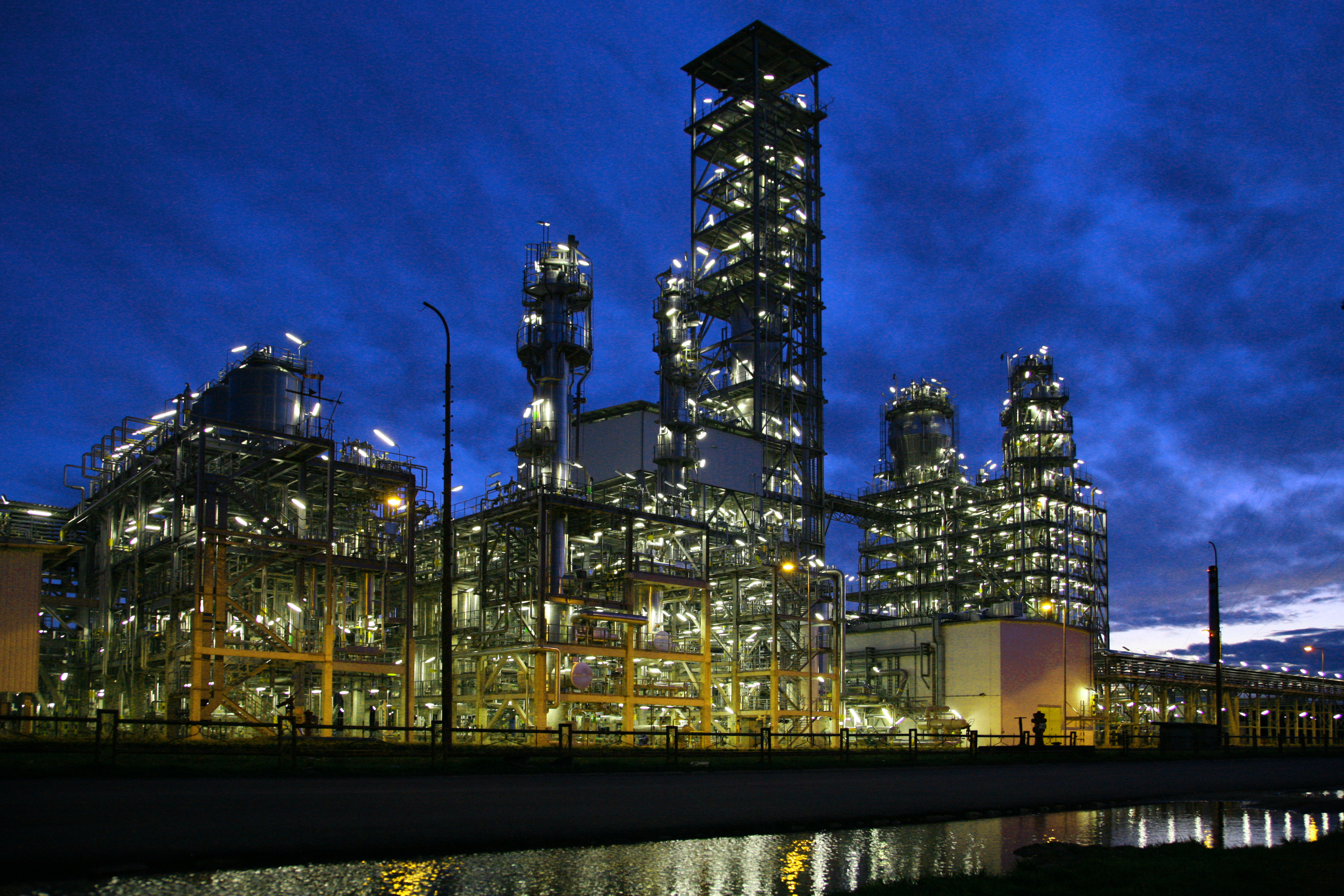
New polypropylene plant PP3

Slovnaft is an oil refining company in Slovakia. The company, located in Bratislava, is a subsidiary of MOL Group.

== History ==
Slovnaft is the successor of the Apollo company. Apollo was established in 1895 in Bratislava. Its refinery was bombarded by the Allies in June 1944. Bratislava Apollo Bridge built over Danube is in proximity to the Apollo refinery historical site. The Slovnaft refinery started to be built in 1949.

On 1 May 1992, Slovnaft was reorganized as a joint-stock company, as successor to a state enterprise formed by the Czechoslovak government on 1 January 1949.

Acquisition of Benzinol, its domestic competitor, took place in 1995.

Since 2000, Slovnaft has been affiliated with the MOL Group.

== Operations ==
=== Refining ===
Slovnaft refines 5.5 to 6 million tonnes of crude oil per annum and produces a broad range of motor fuels, fuel oils and petrochemical products.

=== Petrochemicals ===
Slovnaft Petrochemicals, s.r.o., represents the Petrochemicals Division of Slovnaft Group. It produces polymers which are base materials with a broad range of uses.

=== Fuel retail ===
Slovnaft operates 208 filling stations in Slovakia and offers motor fuels and a broad range of other goods, as well as additional services through this retail network.

=== Power generation ===
CM European Power Slovakia, s.r.o., a Slovnaft Subsidiary, produces electricity, heat, and power.

== Sponsorship ==
Slovnaft is the main partner of the Slovak Cup, now named Slovnaft Cup.

== Environmental burden ==
Slovnaft's factory near Bratislava is a significant polluter of groundwater. To protect the waters of Žitný ostrov, a hydraulic wall of wells has been built east of the Slovnaft site, the polluted water of which is constantly being cleaned.

== See also ==
- Transpetrol AS, Slovak oil pipeline company, operator of the Slovak section of the Druzhba pipeline
