= Triptych Bankside =

Mixed-use development in Bankside, London

Coordinates: 51.5070°N 0.0972°W

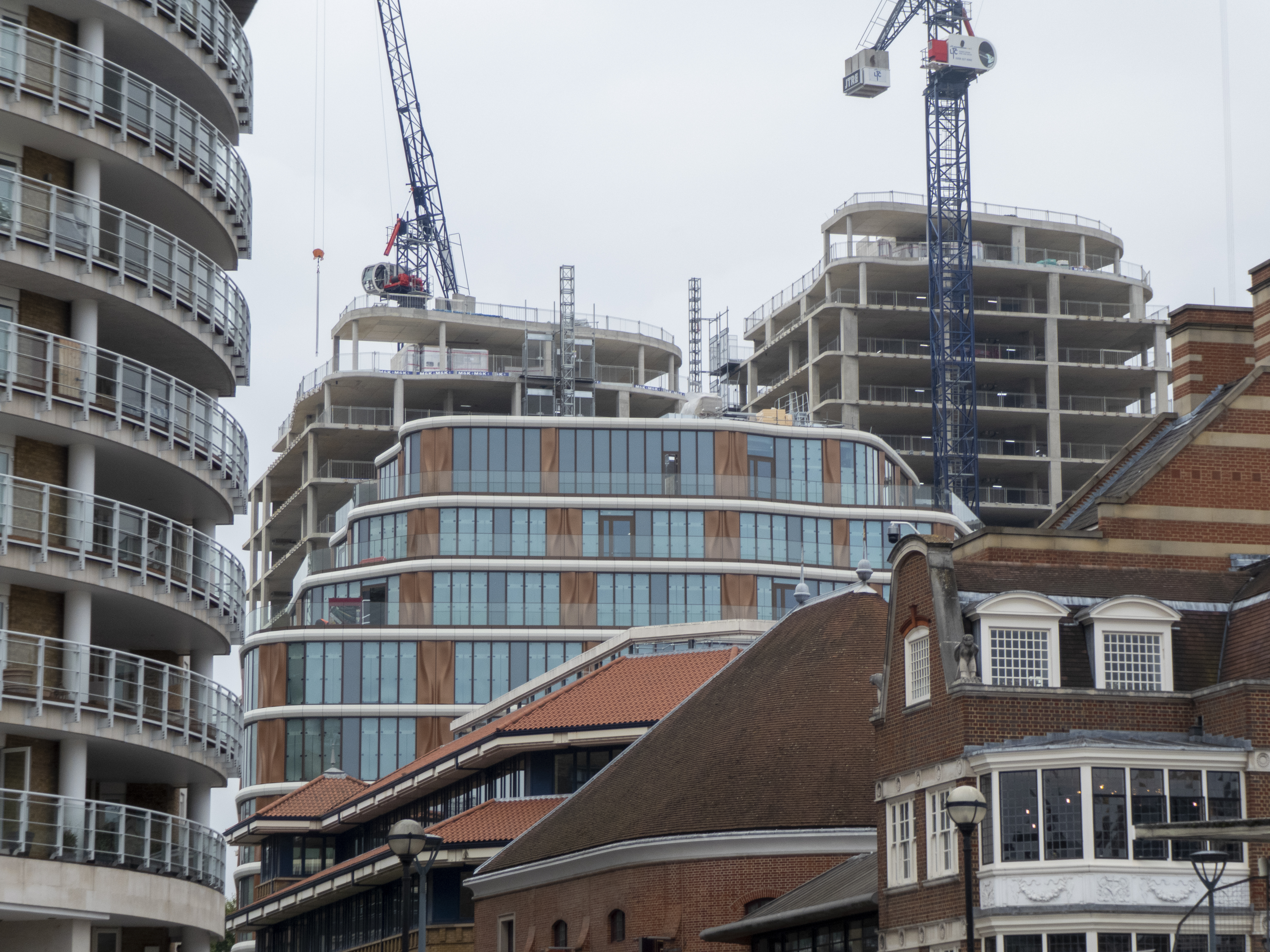
Triptych Bankside as seen in 2021

Triptych Bankside is a mixed-use development in the Bankside area of Southwark in London, United Kingdom. Constructed in 2023, the development by JTRE London comprises two residential towers Triptych East and Triptych West, 15- and 19-story buildings, respectively, and a nine-story office building One Triptych Place. The luxury bronze-coloured steel and glass towers were designed by London architects Squire & Partners.

One Triptych Place office tower was fully leased shortly after its completion. Major tenant is Haleon, a British multinational consumer healthcare company which leased over 30,000 sq ft across five floors of the 68,000 sq ft commercial building. Other tenants include television communications company Digital UK (8,000 sq ft), US architectural firm Corgan (4,800 sq ft.), The Quarto Group (9,000 sq ft), indoor bouldering company The Font (7,000 sq ft), as well as independent coffee company 92 Degrees (2,000 sq ft). JTRE London established its new UK Head Office at One Triptych Place by occupying 4,000 sq ft of space on the first floor. In 2024, Art Academy London opened a cultural and educational center in the building.

All 169 open plan homes across the two residential towers Triptych East and Triptych West benefit from private terraces and balconies. Apartment sizes range from studios to luxury penthouses and owners can use amenities including a 24-hour concierge and security services, underground parking, residents’ business lounge, workspace facilities, private 14 person screening room, games room, gymnasium and a wellness centre.

Together, the buildings offer 169 apartments, over 5600 square metres of offices, and 1350 square metres of retail space. There is also another 1350 square metres available for cultural events.

Name of the development is derived from triptych, a set of three associated artistic, literary, or musical works intended to be appreciated together and it pays homage to the developments positioning as neighbour to the Tate Modern art gallery; whose collections include triptychs from many highly acclaimed artists including Francis Bacon, David Hockney and Damien Hirst.

It is a flagship development of JTRE London, which was founded in September 2019 by one of Central Europe’s leading property developers JTRE. The project's architecture was awarded numerous prizes including WhatHouse? Awards, UK Property Awards, Evening Standard New Homes Awards and the Housebuilder Awards.

== Location ==
Located in the district of Southwark, London, the site is approximately 0.47 hectares in size and is bound by Park Street to the north and west, from where it takes its access, Emerson Street to the east and Sumner Street to the south. The site is directly adjacent to the Tate Modern art gallery to the west where significant extensions are underway to its rear, with the Shakespeare's Globe theatre and Borough Market are located a short walk away.

Located between the Millenium bridge and Southwark Bridge, the site is accessible via riverboat, train, bus or the London Underground, the nearest underground station to the Triptych Bankside development is the Southwark tube station, which is served by the Jubilee line.

== Site history ==
In the past the land lot used to house offices of the Central Electricity Generating Board (CEGB), later National Grid plc. The building was constructed in 1961 and it was acquired in August 2013 by the real estate company Delancey for £55 million.

Delancey's plan to develop the site was unanimously backed by members of Southwark's planning committee and in 2015 a planning permission was granted by the London Borough of Southwark for the demolition of existing buildings and redevelopment to provide a mixed-use development comprising three new buildings containing 169 residential units, office floorspace, retail floorspace, cultural floorspace, provision of parking, servicing and plant areas, hard and soft landscaping. Delancey has negotiated a £30 million package with Southwark Council, including £23.5 million of support for plans by United St Saviour's Charity to build a modern almshouse at the junction of Southwark Park Road and Reverdy Road in Bermondsey, which is today the Appleby Blue almshouse.

The land with legally compliant construction permission was purchased by JTRE in 2018 from Delancey’s DV4 client fund as a brownfield site – having been cleared of all buildings.

The updated redevelopment project started in 2018 and construction of Triptych Bankside began in spring 2019. In September 2021 the construction has reached its highest point with a topping out on the 19th floor. The two residential blocks sit on 420 piles. The structure took 215,000 person-hours to complete and contains 20,000 cubic meters of concrete and 2,700 tonnes of rebar.

The commercial launch happened on 24th March 2022.

The Triptych Bankside landscape scheme was completed by landscaping contractor Maylim in september 2023. Scope of work included groundworks, drainage, and hard landscaping featuring raised lawned areas, trees, and shrubs. The scheme also includes a bespoke lighting scheme and water feature. Land lease expires in the year 3018.

== Description ==
Triptych Bankside was designed by architects Squire & Partners. Show apartments were designed by interior designers Bergman & Mar and Cocovara. Squire & Partners’ conceptual inspiration for Triptych Bankside derives from its site's historical context, the South Bank’s world-renowned art and culture and the natural landscape of its immediate surroundings. The towers' glassy facade features a gentle undulation, inspired by the ebb and flow of the River Thames. Architecture is expressed via earthy, organic and metallic material qualities that express the rich culture of its context. Gently twisting forms, combined with undulating curved terraces wrapping around the exteriors, affords the buildings a considered sculptural aesthetic. All 169 open plan homes across the two residential towers Triptych West and Triptych East benefit from private terraces and balconies.

Amenities include a 24-hour concierge and security services, underground parking, residents’ business lounge, workspace facilities, private 14 person screening room, games room, gymnasium and a wellness centre. The project features independent retailers a cultural facility and landscaped communal gardens. Externally operated facilities include: The Font, a rock climbing and fitness gym; Solo60, a network of micro-gyms; Nagare Café, a Japanese coffee shop; and Uncommon London, a gourmet deli and café. One Triptych Place features concierge services, cafe, and bicycle-commuter facilities (storage, showers and changing rooms).

Apartment prices started from £720,000 for a studio apartment to £9,715,000 for a penthouse apartment.

The buildings incorporate a comprehensive range of sustainable design strategies aimed at minimizing energy consumption and reducing their annual carbon footprint. Passive design principles have been employed to optimize natural light, solar gain, and thermal performance, including strategic glazing placement, solar shading, and enhanced insulation exceeding standard building regulations. Air permeability targets are significantly lower than regulatory minimums, improving thermal efficiency. All residential units are equipped with mechanical ventilation systems with heat recovery (MVHR), achieving high efficiency and reducing heating demand. Energy-efficient systems, low-energy lighting, smart controls, and separate metering of the energy uses within the development helps the building users identify areas of increased consumption and highlight potential energy-saving measures. A central Energy Centre featuring a Combined Heat and Power (CHP) unit and photovoltaic panels supplies low-carbon heating, hot water, and electricity to common areas. The building also integrates biodiversity-enhancing landscaping, including green and brown roofs, native planting, insect hotels, and bird boxes, supporting local wildlife and environmental sustainability.

== Awards and Accreditation ==
One Triptych Place achieved a BREEAM ‘Excellent’ rating by incorporating passive design principles to maximise natural light and airflow and reduce energy consumption, alongside solar panels and energy-efficient glazing. Its ‘smart building’ capabilities were awarded with a WiredScore Platinum certification and One Triptych Place is one of the few buildings in Europe to reach that standard.

Triptych Bankside Awards:

- WhatHouse? Awards: Silver for ‘Best Apartment Scheme’
- UK Property Awards: 5-star award for 'Best Mixed-use Development' in the 'Residential Interior Apartment' category
- Evening Standard New Homes Awards: 'highly commended' recognition for 'Best Luxury Home', 'Best Apartment', and 'Development of Outstanding Architectural Merit'.
- Housebuilder Awards: 'Best Design for Four Storeys or more'
- OAS Development Awards: finalist in the 'City New Build' category
- British Home Awards: finalist in the 'Development of the Year' category

Show apartment at Triptych Bankside by design company Angel O'Donnell was a finalist at Society of British and International Interior Design International Design Awards in the 'Show Flats & Developments – UK' category.

== See also ==
- Bankside
- JTRE London
