= JTRE London =

British real estate developer

- Trade name: JTRE London Ltd.
- Type: limited company
- Industry: real estate development, property management, investment.
- Founded: 2019; 7 years ago London, United Kingdom
- Founder: JTRE
- Headquarters: London, United Kingdom
- Area served: United Kingdom
- Key people: Nigel Fleming (Managing Director)
- Website: jtrelondon.co.uk

JTRE London is a real estate developer based in London, United Kingdom. It was founded by the European real estate developer JTRE with a total value of property developed at approximately €3 billion, featuring offices in Bratislava, Prague, Berlin and London. The company was created in 2019. JTRE London’s portfolio is valued at nearly £1 billion.

== History ==
In 2018, European real estate developer JTRE entered the UK market by purchasing land in Central London at 185 Park Street in the Bankside district of London.

In the past the plot of land used to house offices of the Central Electricity Generating Board (CEGB), later National Grid plc. The land with legally compliant construction permission was purchased by JTRE in 2018 from Delancey’s DV4 client fund as a brownfield site having been cleared of all buildings. In the same year, construction of the Triptych Bankside development started.

JTRE London was founded in September 2019. In 2020 JTRE acquired a local developer of luxury real estate Sons&Co London United and the company agreed to a construction loan of £177m with ICG Real Estate.

Its flagship project Triptych Bankside is a residential, office, and retail development consisting of three towers designed by architects Squire & Partners.

JTRE London partnered with the Southwark-based United St Saviour's Charity to develop 57 self-contained apartments that will provide affordable homes for the borough's residents over the age of 60.

The commercial launch of Triptych Bankside happened on 24th March 2022.

== Properties ==
Notable JTRE London properties include:

=== London ===
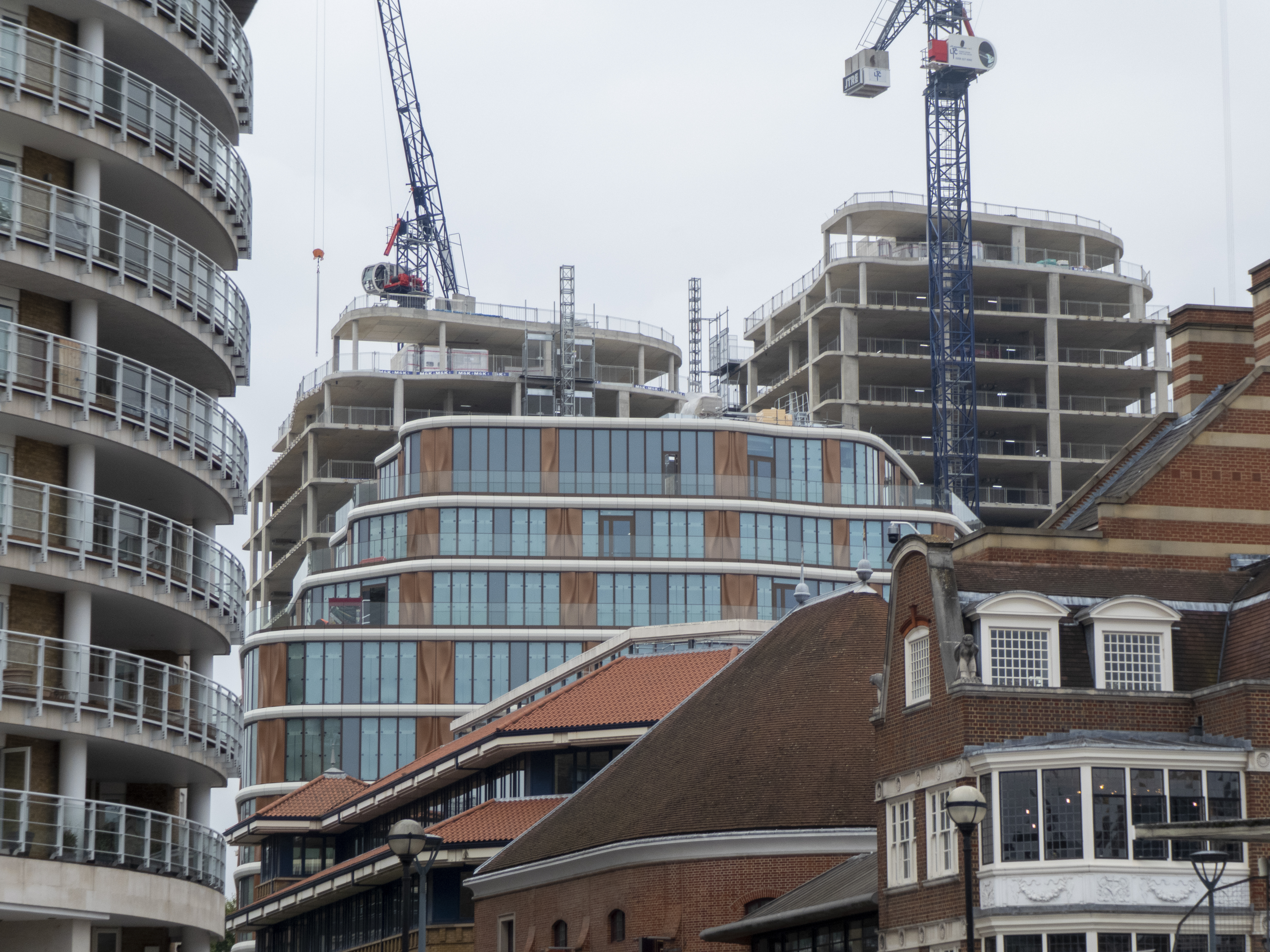
Triptych Bankside under construction in 2021

- Triptych Bankside, South Bank, London - residential, office, and retail development in London's South Bank district. Constructed in 2023, the development comprises two residential towers Triptych East and Triptych West, 15- and 19-story buildings, respectively, and a nine-story office building One Triptych Place. The project received several awards including The Evening Standard New Homes Awards, Housebuilder Awards, as well as the WhatHouse? Awards.

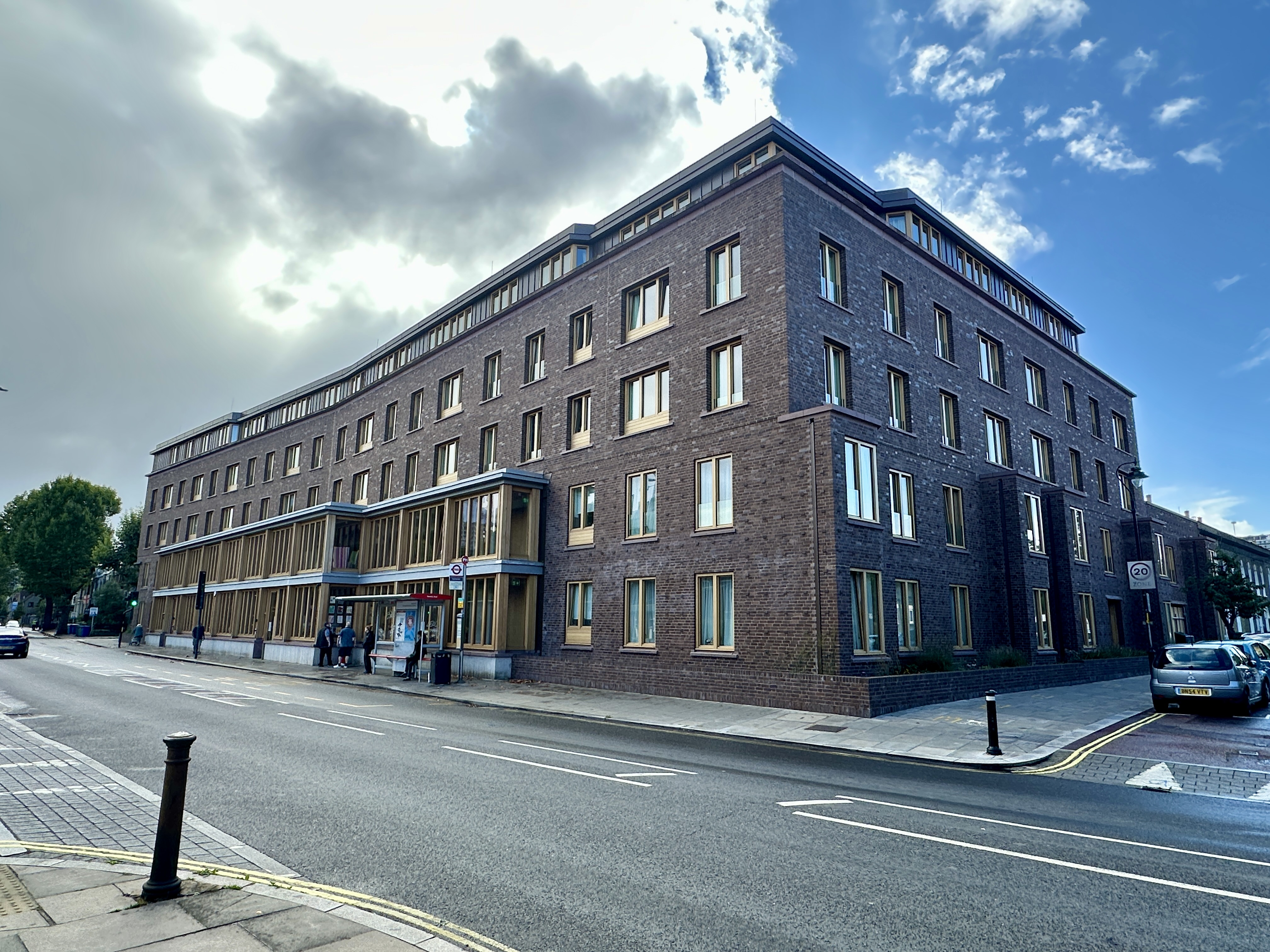
Appleby Blue Almshouses in Bermondsey

- Appleby Blue Almshouse, Bermondsey, London - charity almshouse providing independent sheltered housing for the elderly run by United St Saviour's Charity, offering homes in a community setting to people over 65. The Almshouse combines radical design with future-proof assisted living technologies to provide self-contained homes that meet the needs of older residents of London. It provides 57 dwellings (Class C3 use) and the site was owned by Southwark London Borough Council who sold the land to JTRE London under a Section 106 agreement, for the purpose to provide affordable housing for older people. The project received numerous awards including RIBA London Award 2025 and RIBA National Award 2025.

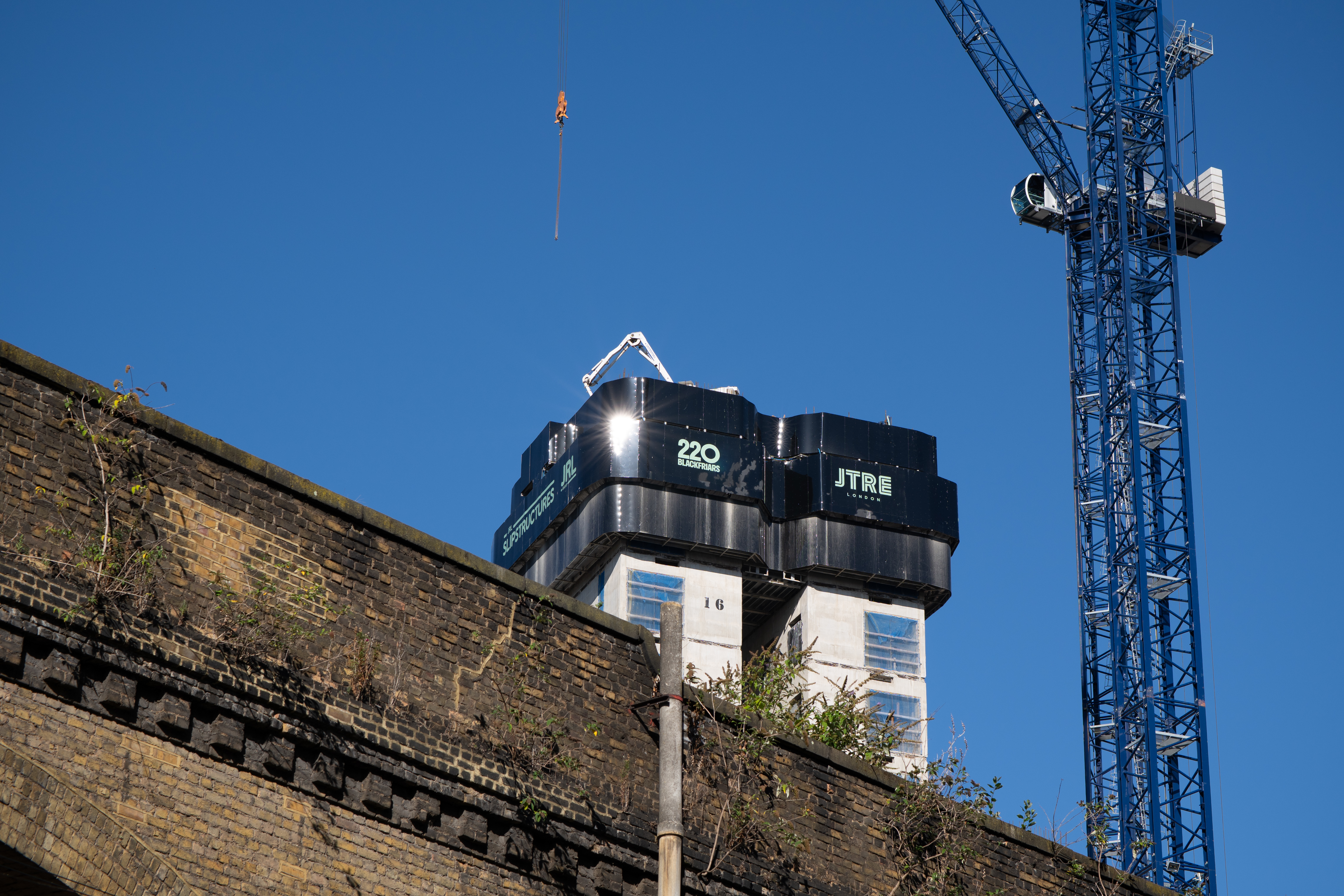
220 Blackfriars Road under construction in 2025

- 220 Blackfriars Road, London - office, retail and almhouse development with Southwark Charities. The scheme features 21 and 15-storey towers with 223,000 sq. ft. of prime office space, a new almshouse with 64 homes, and a community centre and gardens. A feature of the development is a charitable hub, with accessible community facilities for residents and others in the locality, plus a new, enlarged, on-site Prince William Henry public house.

== Corporate governance ==
Nigel Fleming is the Managing Director of JTRE London. In April 2024 JTRE London has appointed Seamus Porter as Operations Director and in May 2024 the company appointed former Knight Frank partner James Keegan as Head of Acquisitions.

JTRE London claims to be committed to advancing sustainable practices using ESG (Environmental, social, and governance) principles, with its parent group JTRE releasing its inaugural ESG report in 2025.

== Operations and strategy ==
JTRE London focuses on mixed-use large-scale urban development. Instead of individual buildings, the company develops integrated urban neighborhoods. Its strategy is part of its parent group JTRE’s preference for prime riverfront locations in major European cities, as evidenced in its developments in London (Triptych Bankside), Bratislava (Eurovea City) and Berlin (Nordhafen Living & Office).

== See also ==
- Real estate in the United Kingdom
- Triptych Bankside
- JTRE
- JTRE Germany
