= Troubleshooter (TV series) =

- Genre: Business
- Presented by: Sir John Harvey-Jones
- Narrated by: Andrew Sachs
- Country of origin: England
- Original language: English
- No. of series: 5
- No. of episodes: 31

Production
- Executive producer: Richard Reisz
- Producer: BBC Television
- Production location: United Kingdom

Original release
- Network: BBC
- Release: 1990 – 2000

Related
- I'll Show Them Who's Boss!

Troubleshooter is a British reality television series, produced and broadcast by the BBC from 27 March 1990. It was hosted by Sir John Harvey-Jones, formerly of ICI, who visited and advised struggling UK businesses.

The series won a BAFTA, and made Harvey-Jones "the most famous industrialist since Isambard Kingdom Brunel".

The greatest achievement of the Troubleshooter was to make business management a popular discussion subject in the homes of millions of British people, and to provide a role model for people wanting to enter business.

A follow-up series titled Troubleshooter – Back in Business aired in 2000 and saw Sir John return to companies featured in the original series from a decade before. In that time there had been a number of changes. Tri-ang Toys had been unable to turn its fortunes around and its UK factory had been demolished. The Morgan Motor Company, where previously Sir John had encountered great resistance, had in fact made many of the changes he suggested.

== Production ==
After originally approaching companies to produce the first series, the BBC production team for the subsequent series were overwhelmed by applications from various British businesses and enterprises. This was in part for the quality of consultation that Harvey-Jones gave, but also for the publicity, which often resulted in an immediate revival for the company through increased sales.

After selecting a breadth of companies, industries and situations, Harvey-Jones and executive producer Richard Reisz would review the applications to choose the selected applicants. Harvey-Jones would nominally only have access to any published accounts, management provided plans, and any items of press and media that could be found, before engaging the company.

The period of consultation was given over a period of at least three months per company, resulting in the third series requiring Harvey-Jones to have reserved dates in his diary for 50 weeks of the year: the major reason he gave up the programme, to concentrate on his charitable activities and family.

=== Harvey-Jones style ===
At its peak, Troubleshooter gained three million viewers per episode. This was attributed to Harvey-Jones' personable, frank and straightforward style, with judgements given through his distinctive style:

- "You are being killed by slow strangulation"
- "The situation is barmy and intolerable"
- "It is possible to break through but only if you charge the guns"

His manner was sharp to be kind, and he emphasised the need to confront change to survive.

Organisations featured included Morgan Motor Company, Copella apple juice and Tri-ang toys, where Harvey-Jones put his finger on the problems they faced or in some cases had created, and pointed the way to success. Sometimes they followed his advice, such as at Copella, and sometimes, notably at Morgan, he was met with strong resistance.

=== Businesses and organisations featured ===
==== Series 1 (1990) ====
1. Tri-ang toys
2. Copella Fruit Juices
3. Apricot Computers
4. Shropshire Health Authority
5. Churchill China
6. Morgan Motor Company

==== Series 2 (1991) ====
1. Troubleshooter–Back in Business
2. Troubleshooter in Eastern Europe
3. Troubleshooter in Eastern Europe 2 – Racing for a Closing Door

==== Series 3 (1992) ====
1. Charles Letts stationery
2. South Yorkshire Police
3. Double Two (Wakefield Shirt Group)
4. Bradford Hospitals Trust
5. Norton Motorcycles
6. Tolly Cobbold

==== Series 4 (1995) ====
1. Troubleshooter–In India
2. Troubleshooter Returns... to School
3. Troubleshooter Returns... to Sea
4. Troubleshooter Returns... to Work

==== Series 5 (2000) ====
1. Change or Die
2. What Now Guru?
3. The Trouble with Love

== Books ==
- Sir John Harvey-Jones with Anthea Masey (4 April 1991). Troubleshooter. BBC Books. ISBN 0-563-36211-1.
- Sir John Harvey-Jones (18 October 1993). Troubleshooter2. Penguin Books. ISBN 0-14-016739-0.
- Sir John Harvey-Jones (14 September 1995). Troubleshooter Returns. BBC Books. ISBN 0-563-37061-0.

== Similar programmes ==
- Digby Jones: The New Troubleshooter
- Badger or Bust
- Mary Queen of Shops
- Gordon Ramsay's series Ramsay's Kitchen Nightmares, Kitchen Nightmares and Hotel Hell
- Get Your Act Together with Harvey Goldsmith
- I'll Show Them Who's Boss with Gerry Robinson
- Alex Polizzi: The Fixer
