= Churchill Living =

British property and construction company

Churchill Living Ltd
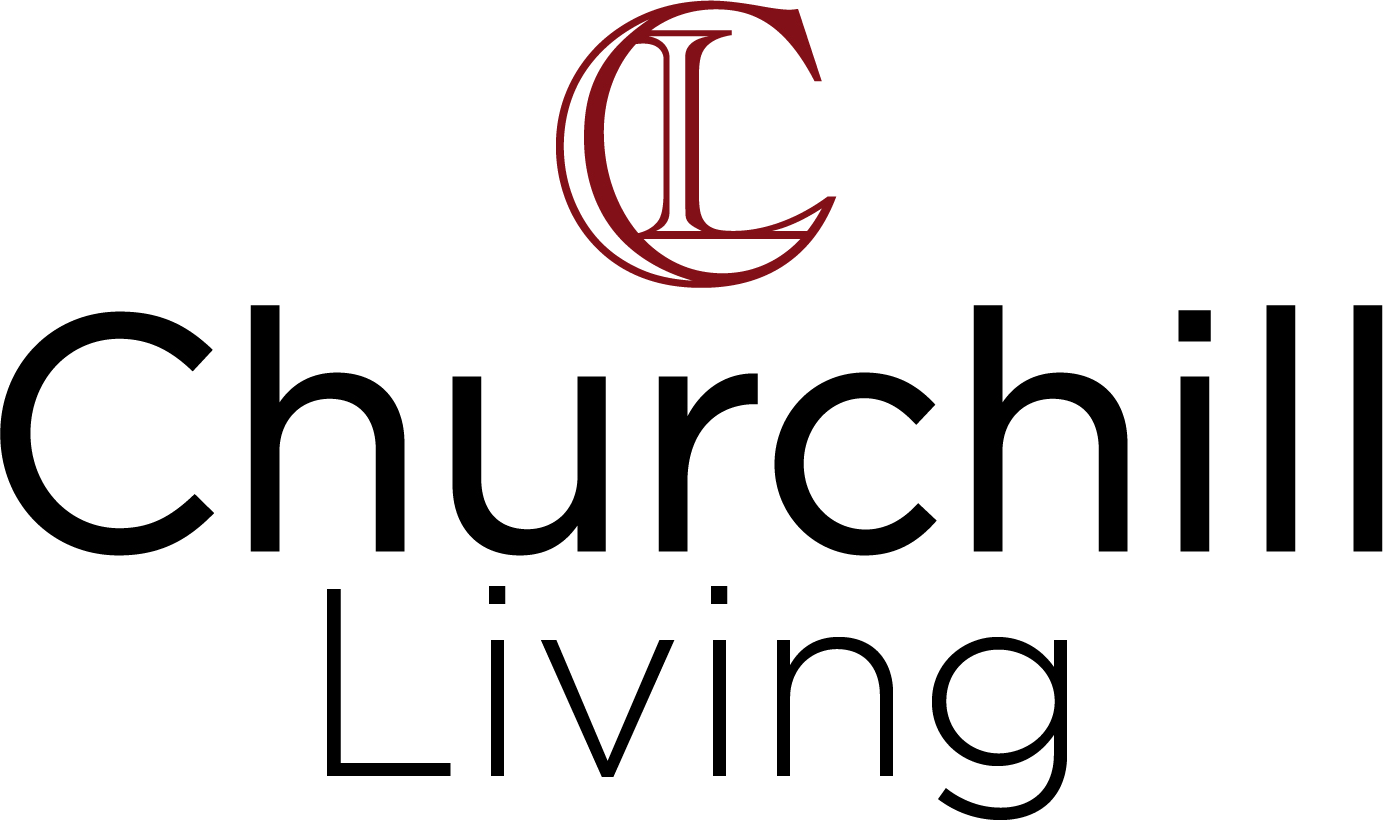
- Formerly: Emlor Homes; Churchill Retirement Living
- Company type: Private
- Industry: Retirement homes
- Founded: 1994; 32 years ago
- Founders: Spencer McCarthy; Clinton McCarthy
- Headquarters: Ringwood, Hampshire, England, United Kingdom
- Area served: United Kingdom
- Revenue: £169.8 million (2025)
- Net income: £3.3 million (pre-tax) (2025)
- Website: churchill-living.co.uk

Churchill Living Limited is a British property development company that specializes in building housing for retired people. It is based in Ringwood, Hampshire.

== History ==
Churchill Living was founded in 1994 as Emlor Homes in New Milton, Hampshire. Co-founder Spencer McCarthy had previously worked at McCarthy & Stone, a company co-founded by his father, John McCarthy, before starting the new business with his brother, Clinton. Initially, Emlor Homes built general housing. After developing several successful retirement apartment schemes by 2001, they decided to focus exclusively on the senior living market.

In 2003, Emlor Homes was renamed as Churchill Retirement Living. By the mid-2010s, it had become one of the UK's largest private providers of retirement housing.

In 2016, Churchill received the WhatHouse? "Housebuilder of the Year" award.

In 2020, it was named as the 3rd Best Company to work for in the UK in the Sunday Times top 100 list.

In July 2024, Churchill Retirement Living shortened its name to Churchill Living.

== Operations ==
Churchill Living develops private one- and two-bedroom apartments and cottages for older homeowners, with an average resident move-in age of approximately 80. Developments typically contain 30–40 units and include communal facilities such as a lounge, gardens, and an on-site lodge manager’s office.

Churchill Living's business model is vertically integrated, covering site acquisition, design, construction, sales of leasehold apartments, and ongoing property management. Each development is staffed by a lodge manager and provides a 24-hour emergency call system. The company also has an in-house estate agency to assist with the resale or letting of properties.

As of 2024, Churchill Living operates from its headquarters in Ringwood, Hampshire, with five regional offices across England.

== Philanthropy ==
In 2015, Churchill Living established the Churchill Foundation, a charitable trust with broadcaster Dame Esther Rantzen as its patron. The foundation raises funds through corporate and staff initiatives and provides grants to local and national charities aligned with its focus areas, including youth homelessness and healthcare organizations. In 2025, the foundation launched a charity partnership with Hourglass (safer aging) the only UK charity that solely advocates against the abuse of older people.

== Subsidiaries ==
Churchill Living operates several subsidiary divisions.

- Churchill Estates Management (CEM) is the property management arm, responsible for the maintenance and services at more than 250 Churchill developments, serving over 10,000 residents.
- Churchill Sales & Lettings is an in-house estate agency that manages the resale and rental of apartments within Churchill developments.
- Churchill Careline provides the 24-hour emergency call system for residents.
