= Letts of London =

Stationer

Letts of London (formerly Letts, Son & Co. Ltd. and Charles Letts & Co. Ltd.) is a brand of stationery that originates from the mid 18th century. It manufactures a range of stationery products, including notebooks, journals, diaries, personal planners, guest books and address books. Other products include password books and personalised stationery.

== History ==
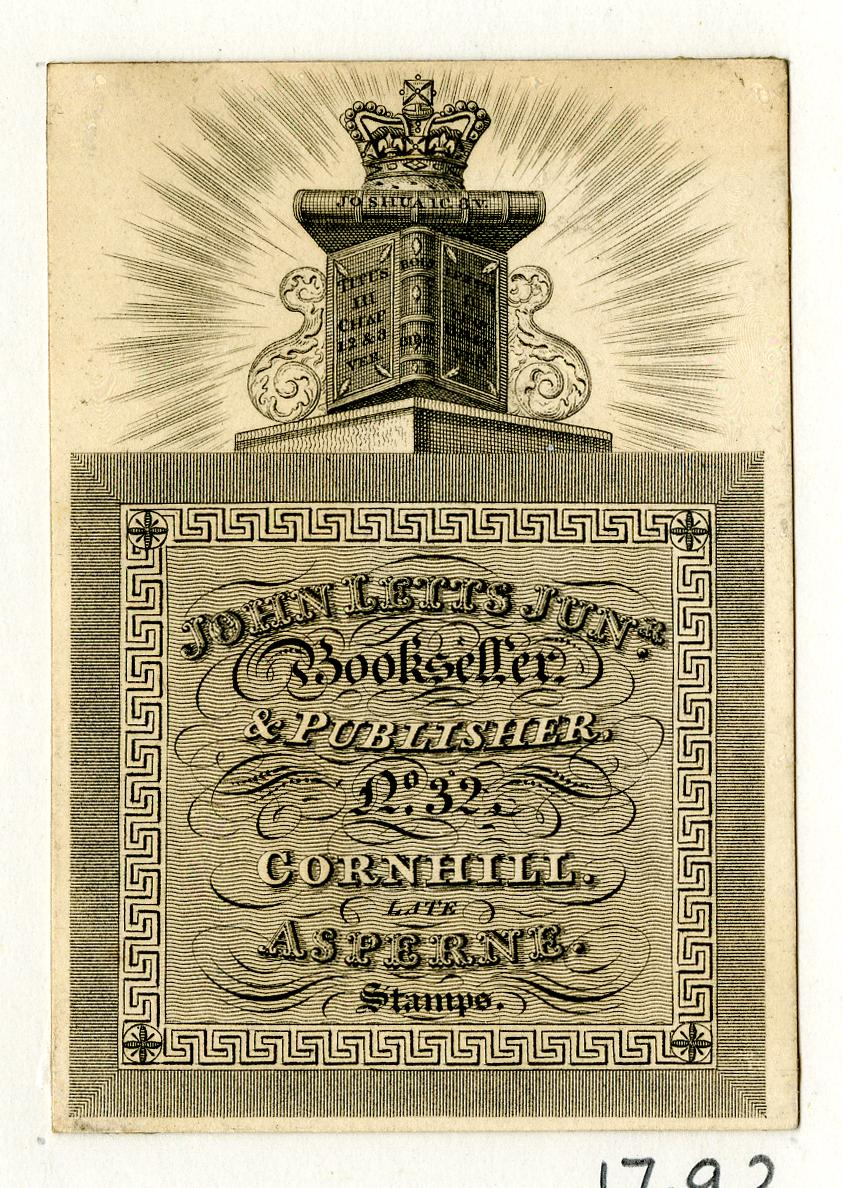
Trade card of John Letts Junior, bookseller at n.32 Cornhill, London (c 1823)

In 1796 John Letts opened a printing, stationery and book binding shop at the Royal Exchange, London, which provided London merchants with stationery products designed specifically for commercial purposes. In 1812 he began selling the first pre-printed commercial diary which combined a journal with a calendar. This combination permitted the diary to be used to record both past and future events, such as appointments – making it particularly useful for traders in the City of London and for commercial dealings with the Port of London. The Letts Commercial Diary had a 104 pages printed with the dates of a six-day working week (Monday to Saturday) and included the dates of public holidays and information such as the tide tables. The creation of the Letts commercial diary was followed by the publishing of the first pocket diary, which was designed for personal use. By the 1820s Letts of London was producing a range of diaries in different sizes and formats.

In 1835 Thomas Letts (son of John Letts) took over the Letts company and began printing diaries that ranged from small pocket diaries to commercial foolscap folio one-day-per-page editions. Additionally, his factories at North Road, New Cross printed interest tables, specialist clerical and medical diaries, calendars, parliamentary registers, ledgers, maps, and logbooks.

As Letts' publications became ubiquitous, adverts for Letts diaries even featured in early editions of Charles Dickens' David Copperfield. Scottish missionary David Livingstone used Letts diaries to keep a record of his travels and missionary work in Africa.

As the leading company in the sector, in 1900 Charles Letts sold almost 250,000 diaries a year, which rose to three million by 1936. By this time Letts was publishing over 400 types of specialist diaries aimed at hobbyists and professionals, including Scouts, motorists, investors, electrical engineers, poultry keepers, wireless amateurs, gardeners and many others.

In the first half of the 20th century, along with Collins, T. J. and J. Smith, John Walker and Co., and Iliffe, Charles Letts and Co. Ltd. continued to be one of the major British diary publishers.

In 1992 the company was featured in the television programme Troubleshooter. New management and investment was secured.

In 2001 Letts purchased Filofax, and is currently owned by the Filofax, Letts and Blueline Group, which also owns the Blueline brand of stationery products. Letts of London is no longer associated with Letts and Lonsdale, which is now wholly owned by HarperCollins.

== Manufacturing facilities ==
Most Letts products are produced in the United Kingdom. The original Letts, Son & Co. Ltd. factory was in North Road, New Cross, London. This was followed by expansion with a book binding premises in Bankside and a leather works in Marshalsea Road, still in London. In 1934 Letts consolidated most of its manufacturing into a single site – Diary House at 77–79 Borough Road, Southwark, which had housed a printers since the 1860s.

In 1980 the Letts manufacturing facilities moved from London to Dalkeith in Scotland. It produces approximately 20 million units per annum. According to the FLB Group Ltd. official website, the group "is now one of the world’s largest innovators and manufacturers of quality stationery and lifestyle accessories, with operations on three continents and distributors in more than 40 countries worldwide".
