= Get Your Act Together with Harvey Goldsmith =

- Starring: Harvey Goldsmith
- Country of origin: United Kingdom
- No. of series: 1
- No. of episodes: 6

Production
- Producer: Ten Alps
- Running time: 46 minutes

Original release
- Network: Channel 4
- Release: 27 March – 1 May 2007

Get Your Act Together with Harvey Goldsmith is a Channel 4 television programme in which promoter Harvey Goldsmith is given six months to help revive the fortunes of six entertainment businesses or performers.

The acts and businesses he deals with are Irish singer and actress Samantha Mumba, husband and wife opera business Opera Anywhere, heavy metal band Saxon, radio station Big L 1395, Deighton Working Men's Club and Paulo's, Britain's oldest circus. He dealt with all simultaneously over a six-month period, but they are each given a separate show in the series.

Much of the show revolves around the battle between Goldsmith and the people who he is trying to help. The acts are often reluctant to take on board his advice, or even to change at all. Goldsmith is often frustrated at the slow pace at which those he is advising are progressing.

== Similar programmes ==
- Badger or Bust
- Mary Queen of Shops
- Ramsay's Kitchen Nightmares
- Troubleshooter (with Sir John Harvey-Jones)
