= JTRE Germany =

- Type: Private
- Industry: Real estate development
- Founded: 2023; 3 years ago
- Founder: JTRE
- Headquarters: Berlin, Germany
- Key people: Lukáš Sásik (CEO)
- Products: Real estate development, Property management, Facility management, Real estate private equity, Investment
- Website: jtre.de/en

JTRE Germany is a real estate developer based in Berlin, Germany. It was founded by the European real estate developer JTRE with a total value of property developed at approximately €3 billion, featuring offices in London, Prague and Bratislava. The company was created in 2023.

The company's strategic focus is on urban development within Germany, with an initial emphasis on the Berlin market. Its flagship project is Nordhafen Living & Office, a large-scale, multi-functional city block currently under construction in the Europacity district of Berlin-Mitte. The project is scheduled for completion in 2027.

== History ==
The parent group JTRE was founded in 1996 in Bratislava, Slovakia with focus on both residential and commercial properties. The establishment of JTRE Germany in 2023 is a continuation of its parent company's history of international expansion.

A significant precedent for the company's German expansion was its entry into the UK market in 2018. JTRE acquired a project in the South Bank neighborhood of London, which was developed into the award-winning Triptych Bankside. The founding of JTRE London served as a benchmark for JTRE’s international strategy and was explicitly referenced when the company established its German operations.

JTRE Germany GmbH was officially founded in April 2023. The company’s entry into the German market was marked by the acquisition of its first development asset in the Berlin-Mitte district.

== Properties ==
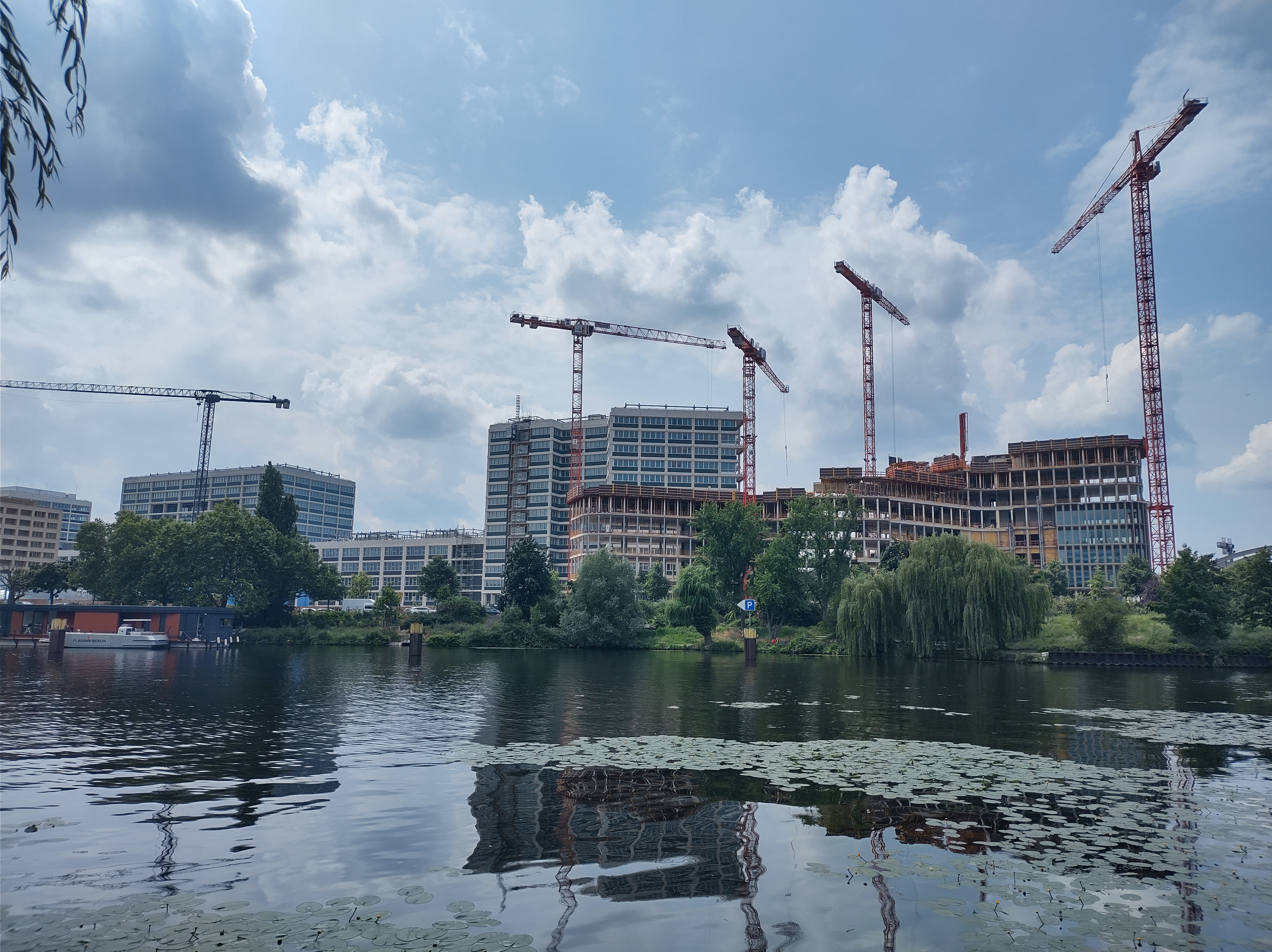
Nordhafen Living & Office under construction in June 2024

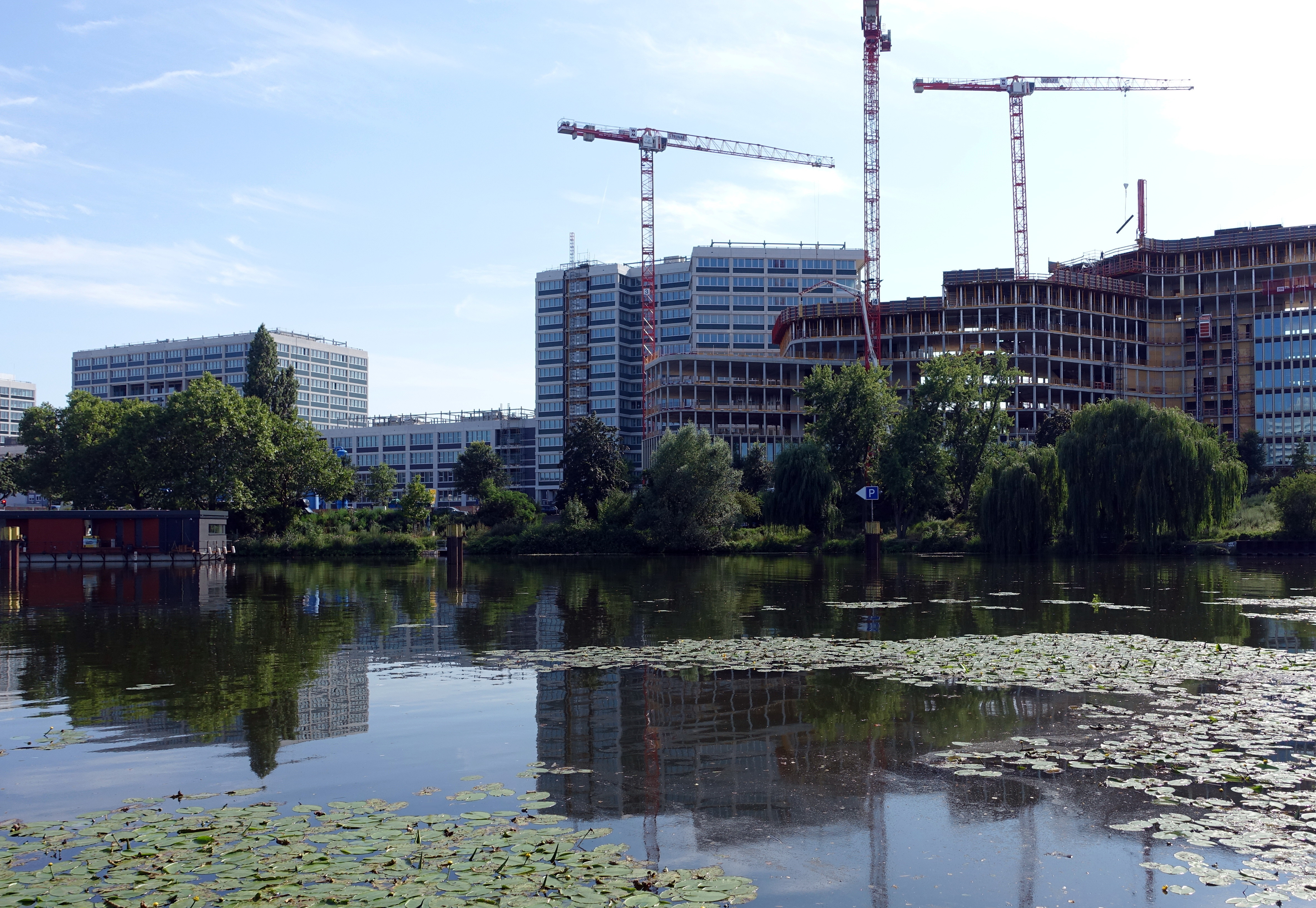
Another view of the construction site in July 2024

JTRE Germany’s largest project is Nordhafen Living & Office in Moabit.

The Nordhafen Living & Office project is part of Quartier Heidestrasse, one of four districts of Europacity, a 40-hectare urban quarter in the central Berlin-Mitte district undergoing large-scale brownfield redevelopment. The location is positioned between Berlin's main railway station and the historic Nordhafen harbour.

The development is a mixed-use urban block designed by the internationally recognized architectural firm gmp Architekten. The design is intended to promote a 15-minute city concept by integrating diverse functions into a single development that serves residents, office tenants, and the wider community. The project has a total gross floor area of approximately 33,000 square meters with 52% of the gross floor area is dedicated to long-term rental housing, comprising 150 residences of varying sizes and 34% of the area is for office use, providing over 7,000 square meters of rental space. The remaining space, approximately 2,500 square meters, is allocated for retail and dining establishments.

The project provides a range of amenities, including a green inner courtyard with a rest zone and children's playground, over 300 bicycle parking racks with associated facilities, and underground parking equipped with electric charging stations. Office tenants will have access to a roof terrace fitted with solar panels.

A ceremonial cornerstone was laid on October 1, 2024, marking the official start of construction of the superstructure. Construction of the reinforced concrete frame is scheduled to be completed in 2026, with the final project delivery scheduled for 2027.

== Corporate governance ==
Lukáš Sásik is the Managing Director of JTRE Germany and the Director of International Operations for the parent company, JTRE. Sebastian Mirrek and Jesper van der Heiden, serve as Project Directors for the Nordhafen Living & Office development.

JTRE Germany places emphasis on ESG (Environmental, Social, and Governance) principles, viewing sustainability as a core business priority rather than a compliance requirement. An example of this is the Nordhafen project, which incorporates a rainwater harvesting system that prevents water from entering the sewer system and provides a source for irrigation, achieving "zero consumption of drinking water" for this purpose.

The project received LEED Platinum pre-certification, which focuses on environmental design and construction. It is also applying for WELL Platinum certification, which measures a building's impact on occupant health and well-being.. By simultaneously pursuing WiredScore and SmartScore certifications, the company signals a commitment to technological infrastructure, connectivity, and smart building technology.

== Operations and Strategy ==
JTRE Germany operates with a business model that leverages the parent company's expertise in large-scale urban development. Rather than focusing on individual buildings, the company positions itself as an urban developer that creates integrated urban neighborhoods (for example Eurovea City in Bratislava).

A core component of this strategy is urban renewal. JTRE Germany seeks to transform long-disused brownfield sites into new green urban districts. The company’s preference for riverside locations is part of its parent group JTRE’s strategy, as evidenced in its developments in Bratislava and London.

Company headquarters is located at Lisa-Fittko-strasse in Berlin.

== See also ==
- JTRE
- Economy of Berlin
