= William Collins, Sons =

Former Scottish publisher

- Parent company: HarperCollins
- Founded: 1819
- Founder: William Collins
- Country of origin: United Kingdom
- Headquarters location: Townhead, Glasgow, Scotland
- Publication types: Books
- Official website: collins.co.uk

William Collins, Sons & Co., often referred to as Collins, was a Scottish printing and publishing company founded by a Presbyterian schoolmaster, William Collins, in Glasgow in 1819, in partnership with Charles Chalmers, the younger brother of Thomas Chalmers, the minister of Tron Church in Glasgow.

Collins merged with Harper & Row in 1990, forming a new publisher named HarperCollins.

== History ==
=== 19th century ===
The firm published its first dictionary, Greek and English Lexicon, in 1824. The company had to overcome many early obstacles, and Charles Chalmers left the business in 1825. The first series of Collins Illustrated Dictionaries appeared in 1840, including the Sixpenny Pocket Pronouncing Dictionary, which sold approximately 1 million copies. By 1841 Collins was established as a printer of Bibles. In 1846, Collins retired and his son Sir William Collins took over.

In 1848, the firm developed as a publishing venture, specialising in religious and educational books. In 1856, the first Collins atlas was published. The company was renamed William Collins, Sons and Co Ltd. in 1868. (The Library of Congress reports W. Collins & Co., or William Collins & Company, Collins & Co., etc., before "sometime in the 1860s", then "William Collins Sons and Co.")

=== 20th century ===
Although the early emphasis of the company had been on religion and education, Collins also published more widely. In 1917, with Sir Godfrey Collins in charge, the firm started publishing fiction. Collins Crime Club (1930–94) published all but the first six of Agatha Christie's novels, starting in 1926, as well as the British editions of Rex Stout's Nero Wolfe books and many others from the Golden Age of Detective Fiction. Upon purchasing the rights to the works of C. S. Lewis, Fount was established as Collins's religion imprint.

Between 1941 and 1949, Collins published Britain in Pictures, a series of social history books which were designed to boost morale during the Second World War. Authors included George Orwell, John Piper, Neville Cardus, Cecil Beaton, Vita Sackville-West, David Low, Francis Meynell, Edith Sitwell, Graham Greene and John Betjeman.

Collins ultimately became a diverse and prolific company, publishing a wide range of titles, including many aimed at a juvenile audience, such as the books of Dr. Seuss (in the Commonwealth) and Racey Helps in the 1950s. Collins founded its New Naturalist series of nature books relevant to the British Isles in 1945, with Butterflies by E. B. Ford. Three volumes appeared in the summer of 2015.

In 1953, Collins launched its Fontana Books series. Later Fontana Books became a Collins imprint complete with its own series, including the Fontana Monarchs, the Fontana African Fiction series and, from 1970, the Fontana Modern Masters, a series of pocket guides to influential writers, philosophers and other thinkers and theorists of the twentieth century. Other William Collins, Sons, imprints included Fontana Lions and Fontana Young Lions, which published books for children and teenagers, and Grafton Books.

In 1965, Collins began publication of The Companion Guides, a series of illustrated travel guides to France, the Mediterranean lands and the British Isles.

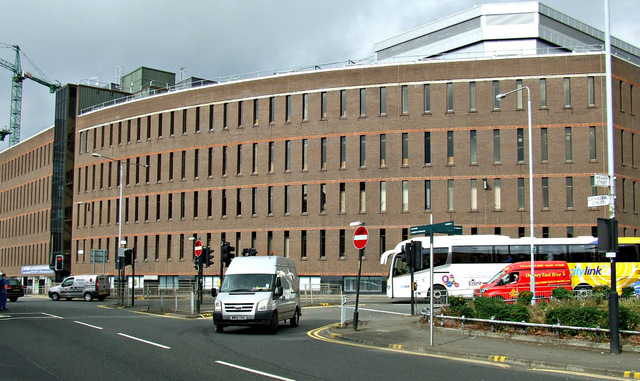
Collins' original site in the Townhead area of Glasgow was sold to the University of Strathclyde in the mid 1970s. The former warehouse and distribution building (originally constructed in 1960) is now the Curran Building and Andersonian Library.

In the mid 1970s, Collins moved all of its operations out of its historic site in the Townhead area of Glasgow, to a new factory in Bishopbriggs. The land and buildings were purchased by the University of Strathclyde who demolished much of the site, with the exception of the Montgomery Building - an office block built in 1953 - which is now the Lord Hope Building, and the giant warehouse building at the corner of Cathedral Street and St James's Road which is now the Curran Building and Andersonian Library. 181 St James's Road was also retained by the university and is used as a workshop and base for the Estates Management group.

By the late 1970s, Collins was also responsible for publishing the long-running American Children's Hardy Boys and Nancy Drew series in the United Kingdom. These were firstly published in a series of digest size hardbacks akin to their American style. Paperbacks soon followed from Collins' Armada Books imprint, although the series as published in Great Britain follow a different numbering system to the accepted American one. Collins's Armada Books imprint also published similar series, such as the Three Investigators, alongside such British stalwarts as Biggles, Billy Bunter, and Paddington Bear, and such well-loved authors as Enid Blyton, Malcolm Saville, and Diana Pullein-Thompson.

News Corporation acquired a 40% stake in 1981. In 1983, Collins acquired the publishing operations of Granada. News Corporation became sole owner in 1989. In 1990, the company was merged with US publisher Harper & Row to form HarperCollins. Collins became an imprint of HarperCollins.

=== 21st century ===
On 8 February 2013, it was announced that some parts of the Collins non-fiction imprint would be merged with the HarperPress imprint to form a new William Collins imprint.

== Collins Education ==
Collins Education, an imprint of HarperCollins Publishers, is the third-largest educational publishing house in the United Kingdom.

It publishes print and interactive digital products for primary and secondary teachers in the United Kingdom and internationally.

In 2010, Collins Education acquired three publishers, Belair Creative, a British publisher specialising in art and design resources for British primary students, Letts and Lonsdale, a major UK publisher of revision guides, and Leckie & Leckie, a Scottish educational publisher.

In 2011, Collins Education launched Collins Online Learning, an online learning platform for students and teachers.
