= Letts and Lonsdale =

British publisher of educational materials

Letts and Lonsdale is a British educational publisher of revision guides under the Letts and Lonsdale brand names. The company is a subsidiary of HarperCollins, an international publisher owned by News Corporation, and is within the company's Collins Education division. The company previously published revision guides under the Letts Educational and Lonsdale SRG brands, while owned by Huveaux PLC.

Letts and Lonsdale also provides schools and users with online revision products, including downloadable podcasts.

Revision support is also provided through publications that teach pupils effective study skills and other advice to help with test and exam preparation. In March 2010, Letts and Lonsdale, along with Leckie and Leckie, were sold by Huveaux PLC to HarperCollins. Both companies became part of Collins Education.

== See also ==
- Letts of London
