= Europacity (Berlin) =

Urban development area in Berlin, Germany

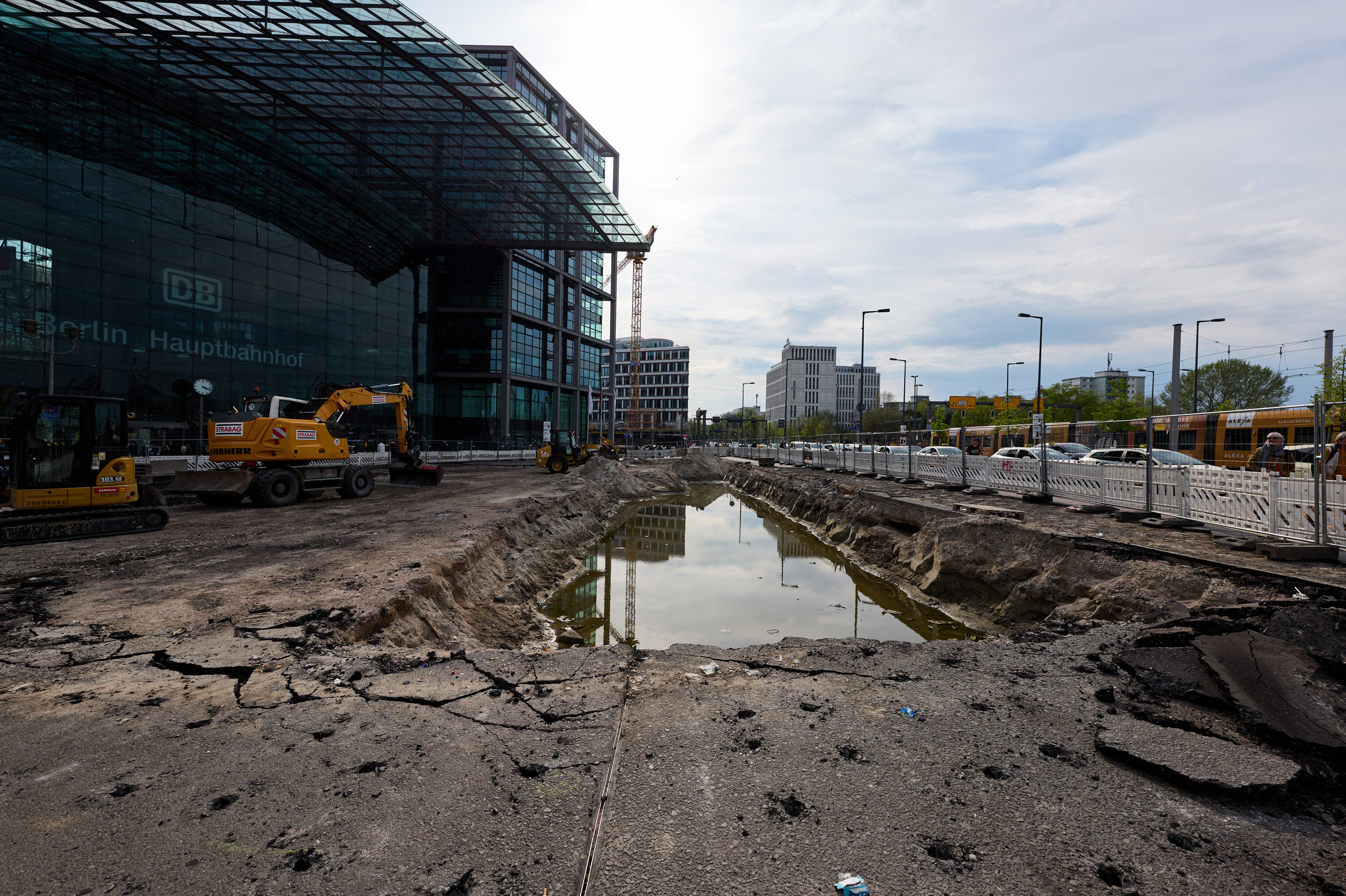
Construction in Europacity next to the Berlin Hauptbahnhof

Europacity (also called Quartier Heidestraße) is a locality and large urban development area located in the Berlin district of Moabit in the borough of Mitte, Berlin, Germany. It is one of the largest building areas in the city north of Europaplatz and Berlin Hauptbahnhof.

== Location ==
The Berlin-Mitte area of Europacity is located north of Europaplatz. To the north it is bordered by the north-south long-distance railway leading to the main station, the Perleberger street and the Berlin-Spandau shipping channel, to the south it is bordered by the Humboldthafen, the Spree and the Alt-Moabit street.

The entire area of Europacity covers about 85,000 square metres.

== Transport ==
The main street in the quarter is Heidestraße, with a traffic of up to 50,000 vehicles daily. Due to the immediate proximity to the main train station, Europacity is well connected to long-distance, regional and local transport in the south and the S-Bahn in the north.

== Notable buildings ==
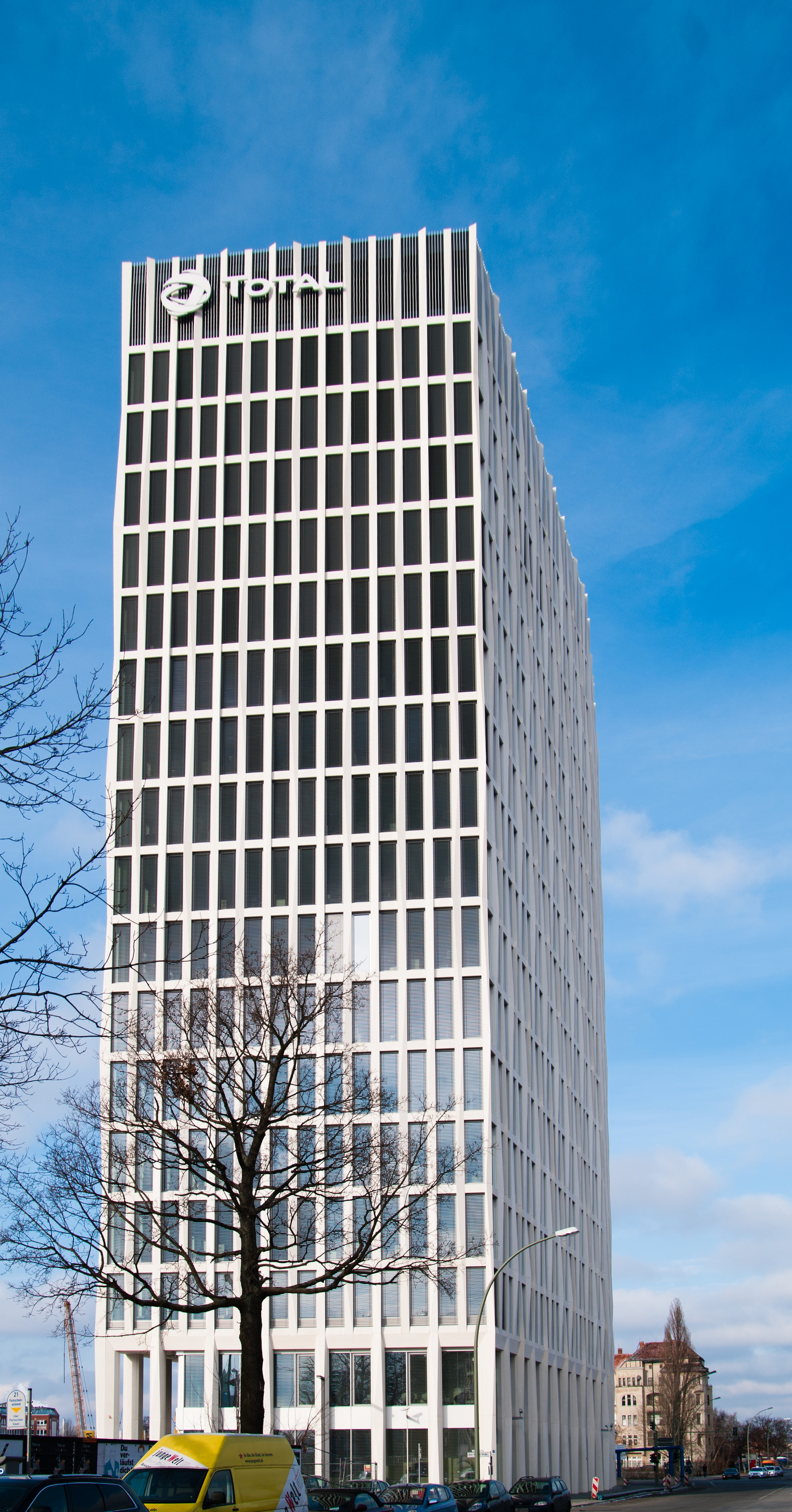
Tour Total Berlin office building in Europacity

In July 2010, Vivico started construction of the Tour Total Berlin, a 69-meter-high office building for the French petroleum company TotalEnergies, on the northern part of Europaplatz, which acts as a gateway to the Europacity.

In 2016, the company headquarters for the company 50Hertz Transmission GmbH was completed. The design comes from the office Love Architecture Graz.

In 2019, the software manufacturer SAP announced that it would build a branch in the district and invest 200 million euros in the next ten years.

In 2024, JTRE Germany acquired a project on Heidestraße and developed it as Nordhafen Living & Office. The design comes from the office Gerkan, Marg and Partners.

== See also ==
- Boroughs and quarters of Berlin
