= Bankside =

Coordinates: 51.5082°N 0.1001°W

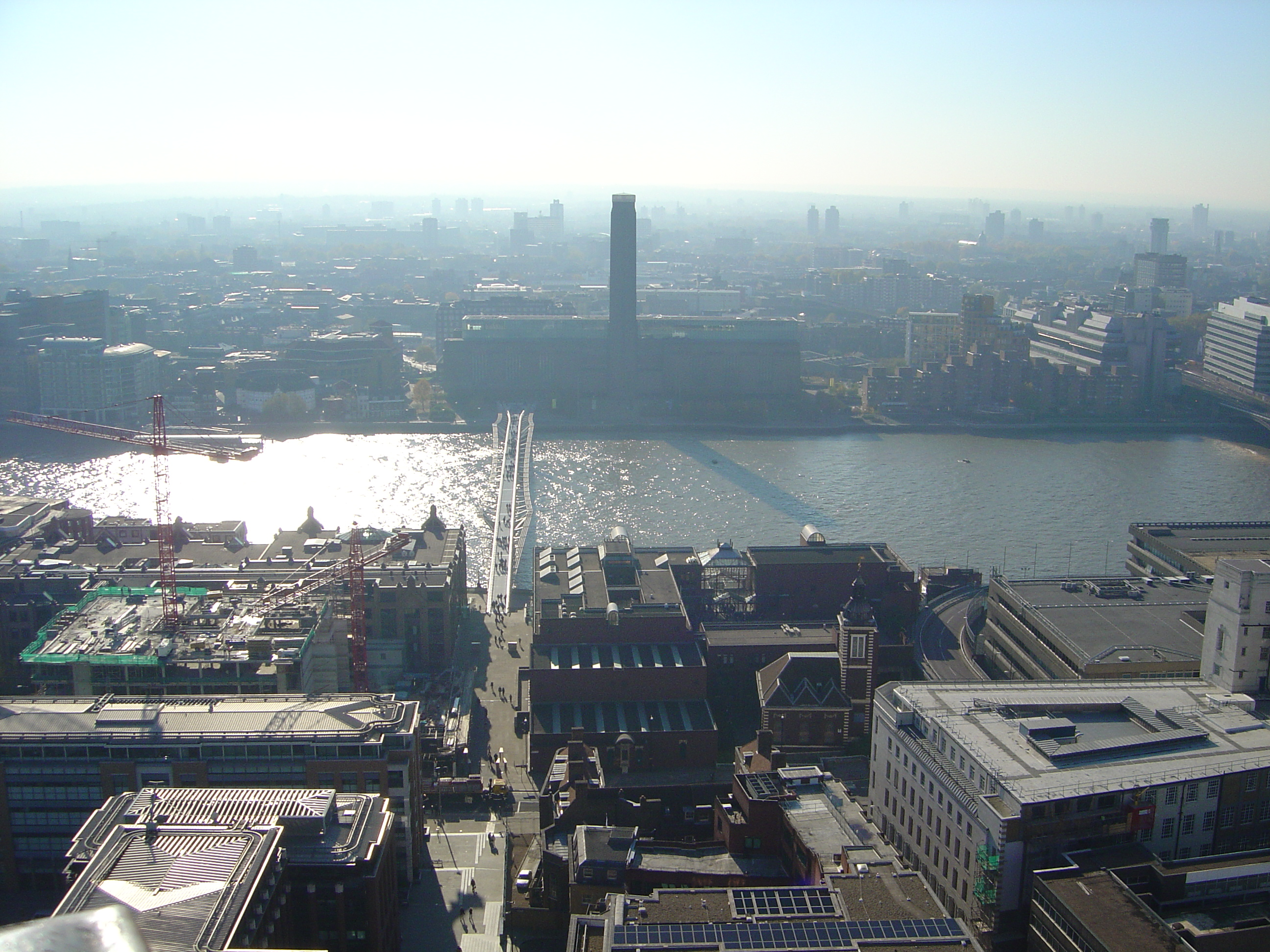
- Bankside, including the Tate Modern, viewed from opposite (north) side of the River Thames

- Location within Greater London
- OS grid reference: TQ319805
- London borough: Southwark
- Ceremonial county: Greater London
- Region: London
- Country: England
- Sovereign state: United Kingdom
- Post town: LONDON
- Postcode district: SE1
- Dialling code: 020
- Police: Metropolitan
- Fire: London
- Ambulance: London
- UK Parliament: Bermondsey and Old Southwark
- London Assembly: Lambeth and Southwark

Bankside is an area of London, England, within the London Borough of Southwark. Bankside is located on the southern bank of the River Thames, 1.5 miles (2.4 km) east of Charing Cross, running from a little west of Blackfriars Bridge to just a short distance before London Bridge at St Mary Overie Dock. It is part of a business improvement district known as 'Better Bankside'.

== History ==
=== Toponymy ===
The 'banke' was reclaimed by the Bishop of Winchester who owned the manor of the Clink of which this is part. There is a map plan in the Duchy of Lancaster archive showing 'the way to the banke'. The name is recorded in 1554 as the Banke syde and means 'street along the bank of the Thames'. In 1860 Southwark Street was created to connect the Blackfriars and London bridge crossings here and that can be regarded as the area's informal southern perimeter.

=== Urban development ===
Bankside is the riverside of the former liberties of the Clink and Paris Garden. In the Elizabethan period, because it was outside the City of London and its authority, the area of the Clink and Paris Garden became occupied by the bear baiting pits and playhouses, including the Rose, the Hope Theatre, the Swan and the Globe Theatre of which a replica was constructed in the late 1990s. The history of the area is traced in a study that traces the earliest known history of a particular building on Bankside until the present day. It has experienced regeneration in recent decades, becoming a significant tourist destination, and forms a business improvement district. The skyline of Bankside is dominated by the former Bankside Power Station, which now houses the Tate Modern.

A major new development in the area is the Bankside 1/2/3 complex on Southwark Street. Together, these three buildings house about 5,000 employees. Bankside 1, also known as the Blue Fin Building, was built for and partially occupied by IPC Media, while Bankside 2 and 3 are occupied by The Omnicom Group Ltd. The architect for the buildings was Allies and Morrison.

Another new mixed-use development, the Triptych Bankside was constructed in 2023 by JTRE London and designed by London architects Squire & Partners. The development comprises two luxury residential towers Triptych East and Triptych West, 15- and 19-story buildings, respectively, and a nine-story office building One Triptych Place.

== Governance ==
It is part of the Borough and Bankside Community Council which corresponds to the Southwark electoral wards of Cathedrals and Chaucer. They are part of the Bermondsey and Old Southwark Parliament constituency and the Member of Parliament is Labour's Neil Coyle. It is within the Lambeth and Southwark London Assembly constituency.

== Transport ==
Since 1754 the Blackfriars Bridge has formed a connection to the north and in 1819 Southwark Bridge has connected the area into the City. In 2000 a direct pedestrian connection was opened between the Tate Modern and St Paul's Cathedral via the Millennium Bridge, which also hosts two Cycle Hire stations.

Blackfriars station on the City side north bank of the river was redeveloped as part of the Thameslink Programme and opened a Bankside entrance in 2012. London Bridge and Southwark are the other stations closest to Bankside, located to the east and south of it respectively. It is served by bus routes 381 and RV1 which are hydrogen powered.

== See also ==
- Bankside Farmers – A group of five early American colonists originally resident in the Bankside district of London.
