= Badger or Bust =

2007 British reality television series

- Genre: Reality television
- Created by: Diverse Production
- Country of origin: United Kingdom
- Original language: English
- No. of seasons: 1
- No. of episodes: 6

Production
- Running time: 60-minute episodes

Original release
- Network: Sky One
- Release: 8 May – 13 June 2007

Badger or Bust is a British reality television series in which Ruth Badger helped to turn failing businesses into successful companies. The series was produced by Diverse Production for Sky One, and premiered on 8 May 2007.

Ruth Badger is a business consultant with 13 years experience in sales. In the show she analysed the practices of struggling businesses and attempted to address their issues in order to revive sales. She offered leadership advice, training and sales guidance to try to bring success.

== Episode guide ==
=== Episode 1 ===
- First broadcast 8 May 2007

In the first episode, Ruth visited Redseven, a Stag and Hen weekend party planning operator based in Brighton. Red Seven were receiving one thousand leads a week but only converted 12% into deals.

Badger focussed on new members of the sales team and highlighted a knowledge gap with those new members, set "apprentice" like tasks to improve their confidence and created low strategy competitions to test the productivity.

=== Episode 2 ===
- First broadcast 15 May 2007

In the second episode, Badger travelled to Dereham to help improve the caravan sales of Greentrees Adventure Store. Badger had to deal with an MD who didn't know the day of the week and a lazy, squabbling, three-man, sales team. During the episode Badger clashed with a rude member of the sales team, and help another build up his confidence.

=== Episode 3 ===
- First broadcast 23 May 2007

In the third episode, Ruth travelled to Bradford to help improve the sales at Rooms with a View a company who sold windows, doors and conservatories. Ruth's ideas had such an impact that when she returned she discovered the firm had been wound up and closed.

=== Episode 4 ===
- First broadcast 30 May 2007

Badger assists Estate Agent Kilostate in Norwood. Manager, Dal's branch deals with sales and lettings, they do about two sales a month and around ten lettings. They have 15 properties on their books compared to over 100 in rival agents. Badger suggested sales training, leaflets to attract business, better communication and sales targets.

=== Episode 5 ===
- First broadcast 6 June 2007

Ruth caused mayhem riding a small portable bicycle. Ruth ran into problems with the boys and a sales floor which resembled a funeral parlour.

=== Episode 6 ===
- First broadcast 13 June 2007

Badger in this final episode of the season visits Camberley Curtains, in her home town of Wolverhampton, and tries to establish them with one of the UK's largest interior design companies in the country, Inside Right Ltd.

== See also ==
- Troubleshooter (TV series)
