= JTRE =

European real estate development firm

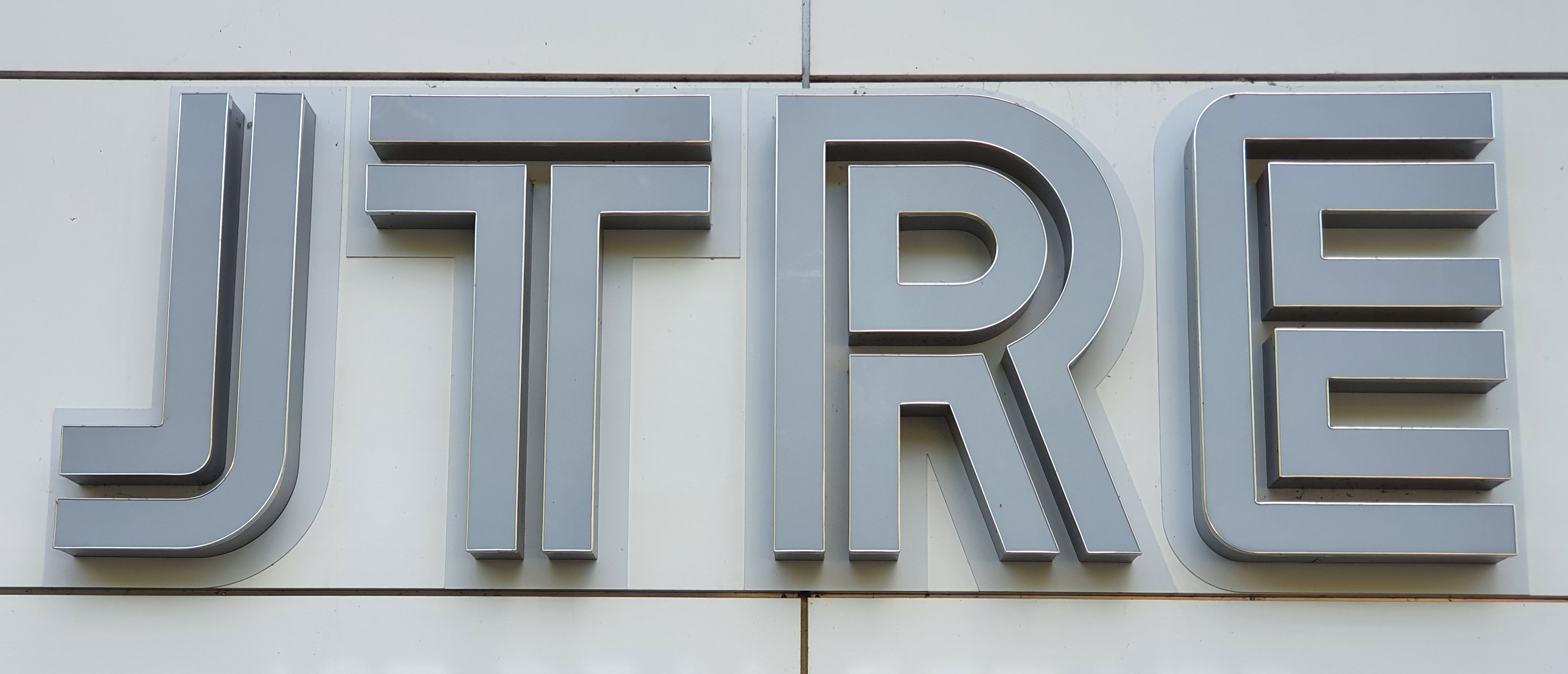
- Industry: Real estate development
- Founded: 1996; 30 years ago Bratislava, Slovak Republic
- Founder: Peter Korbačka
- Headquarters: Bratislava, Slovak Republic
- Area served: Europe
- Key people: Pavel Pelikán (CEO)
- Total assets: ▲€1 000 000 000
- Number of employees: 300
- Subsidiaries: JTRE LONDON, Ltd., JTRE Germany GmbH
- Website: jtre.sk/en

JTRE (formerly J&T Real Estate) is a European real estate developer based in Bratislava, Slovakia. The firm has completed over 50 projects in 9 countries with a total value of property developed at approximately €3 billion and it is active in many market segments – including mixed-use, office, residential, hospitality, logistics, retail, and industrial projects.

JTRE was founded in 1996 as part of the central European investment group J&T. The company is controlled by holding company J&T Real Estate Holding Limited, which is owned by founder Peter Korbačka and other management. JTRE has offices in London, Berlin, Prague and Bratislava.

The company is a multiple-time Developer of the Year in Slovakia, as awarded by the ASB Magazine and it was awarded the Award for Exceptional Construction Quality by the Association of Construction Entrepreneurs of Slovakia. Since 2012, it has been a member of the Slovak Green Building Council. In 2025, JTRE´s Appleby Blue project in Southwark, London, won the prestigious RIBA Stirling prize.

== History ==
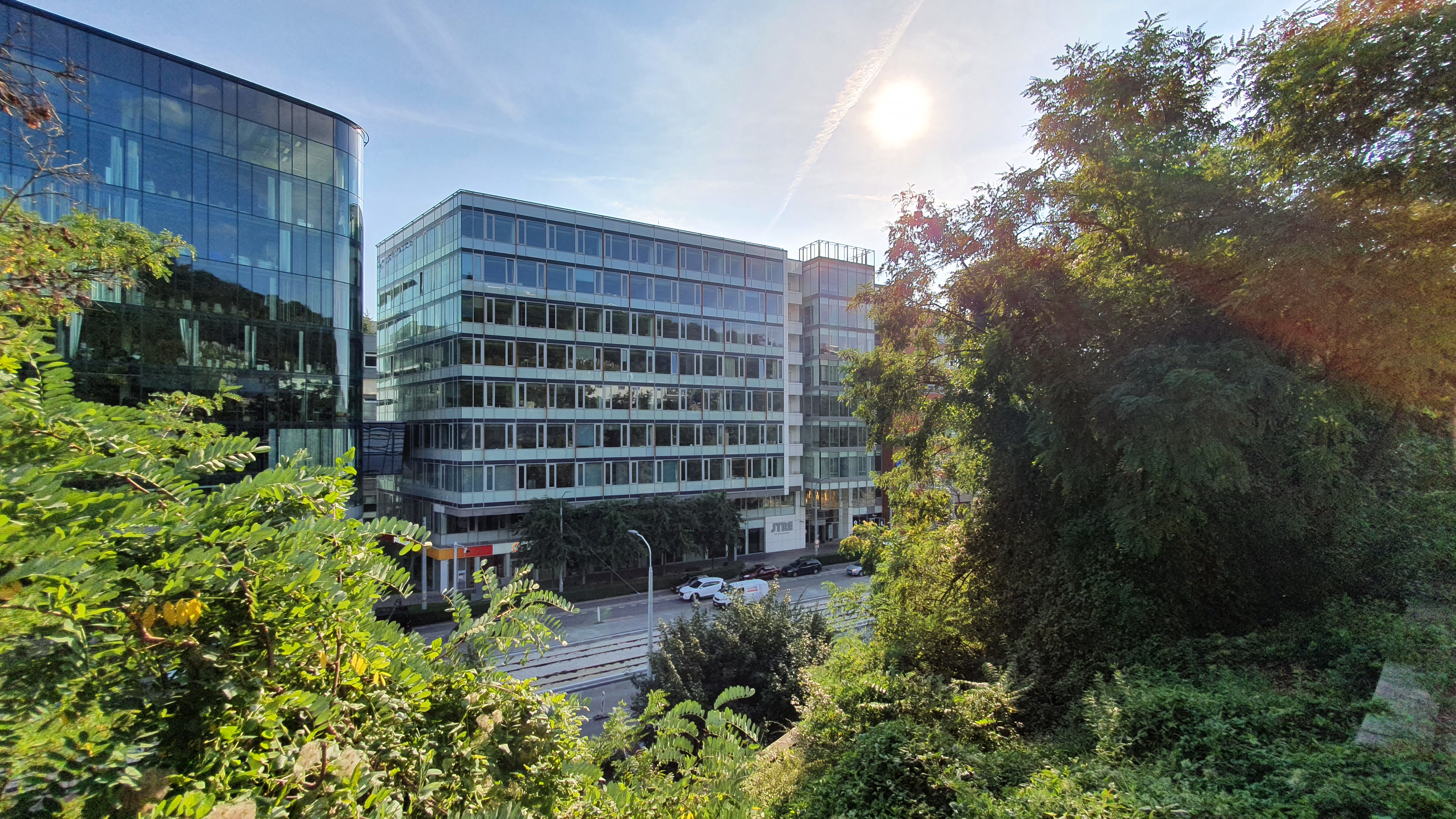
The headquarters of JTRE in Dvořákovo nábrežie Street, Bratislava.

JTRE was founded in 1996 in Bratislava, Slovakia as J&T Global by Slovak businessman Peter Korbačka as part of the J&T Finance Group. The first project was Mestské vily Machnáč, a residential development on the Bratislava Castle hill in Slovakia. The first office development was the reconstruction of Westend Tower in the Patrónka neighborhood of Bratislava, Slovakia.

Over time, JTRE acquired numerous high-profile land lots in Bratislava and Prague and the company graduated into developing whole city neighborhoods, such as the new downtown of Bratislava branded as Eurovea City. In 2006 the company changed its name to J&T Real Estate and two years later JTRE Holding was established dividing from J&T Finance Group. It diversified its portfolio with hotel property development in Moscow (Hotel Baltschug Kempinski Moscow), Bratislava (Grand Hotel River Park) and the High Tatra mountains (Grand Hotel Kempinski High Tatras) as well as branching out into industrial halls development and retail space development (Eperia Shopping Mall in Prešov).

In 2018 the company entered the UK real estate market by acquiring a project in the South Bank neighborhood of London. The project was developed as Triptych Bankside. Later, J&T Real Estate acquired the London-based real estate developer Sons & Co London Limited and transformed it into JTRE London Limited.

In October 2020, JTRE was awarded ASB Developer of the year 2020 in Office Segment at the 14th ASB GALA 2020 for its Westend Plazza, Pribinova 19, Landererova 12, and Zuckermandel developments.

In 2021, Foster + Partners and JTRE established the Bordeaux-based Le Dôme winery in France. The modern winery building is partially submerged into a slope to naturally complement the region’s rolling countryside, which is on the UNESCO World Heritage Site list.

In March 2021, CIJ Awards Slovakia awarded Best Upcoming in Development to the new Eurovea City project in downtown Bratislava. In November 2021, JTRE celebrated 25 years in the real estate market. During this time, JTRE has become a major Central European urban developer and the company took a leading role in shaping the architecture of contemporary Bratislava.

In April 2024, JTRE entered the German market by establishing JTRE Germany and acquired its first project Nordhafen Living & Office as part of Berlin’s new Europacity development.

In October 2024, JTRE was awarded four Developer of the Year awards at the annual ASB Gala 2024. JTRE won gold with first place in the residential segment for Eurovea Tower, Eurovea Riverside, Ovocné sady Trnávka and Kynek Rezidencie. Pribinova 34 and Pribinova 40 won in the administration segment. Eurovea, which was extended to become Slovakia’s largest shopping centre, took the retail segment crown and the fourth prize - ASB Developer of the Year - was awarded by public vote.

In November 2024, JTRE announced that KCAP architects won the JTRE international competition for new Bratislava skyscrapers. The two slender towers reaching 260m and 184m will be part of the Eurovea City quarter in the downtown area of Bratislava.

In February 2025, JTRE released its inaugural ESG report, despite the fact that mandatory reporting for JTRE starts only in the year 2026.

In April 2025, Eurovea Tower has been awarded the Award for exceptional construction quality presented by the Association of Construction Entrepreneurs of Slovakia at the 30th annual Slovak Building of the Year (Stavba roka) event.

== Operations ==
The company's operations are divided into five business segments:

- Real estate development
- Property management
- Facility management
- Real estate private equity
- Investment

== Portfolio ==
Notable properties developed by JTRE include Triptych Bankside, Eurovea extension with the first Slovak skyscraper Eurovea Tower, River Park, Zuckermandel, Klingerka, Panorama Towers, Pribinova 34, Landererova 12, Pribinova 19, Ovocné sady, Rustonka, Westend, Karloveské rameno, Fuxova Residences, Grand Hotel Kempinski High Tatras, Baltschug Kempinski Moscow and Eperia Shopping Mall in Prešov.

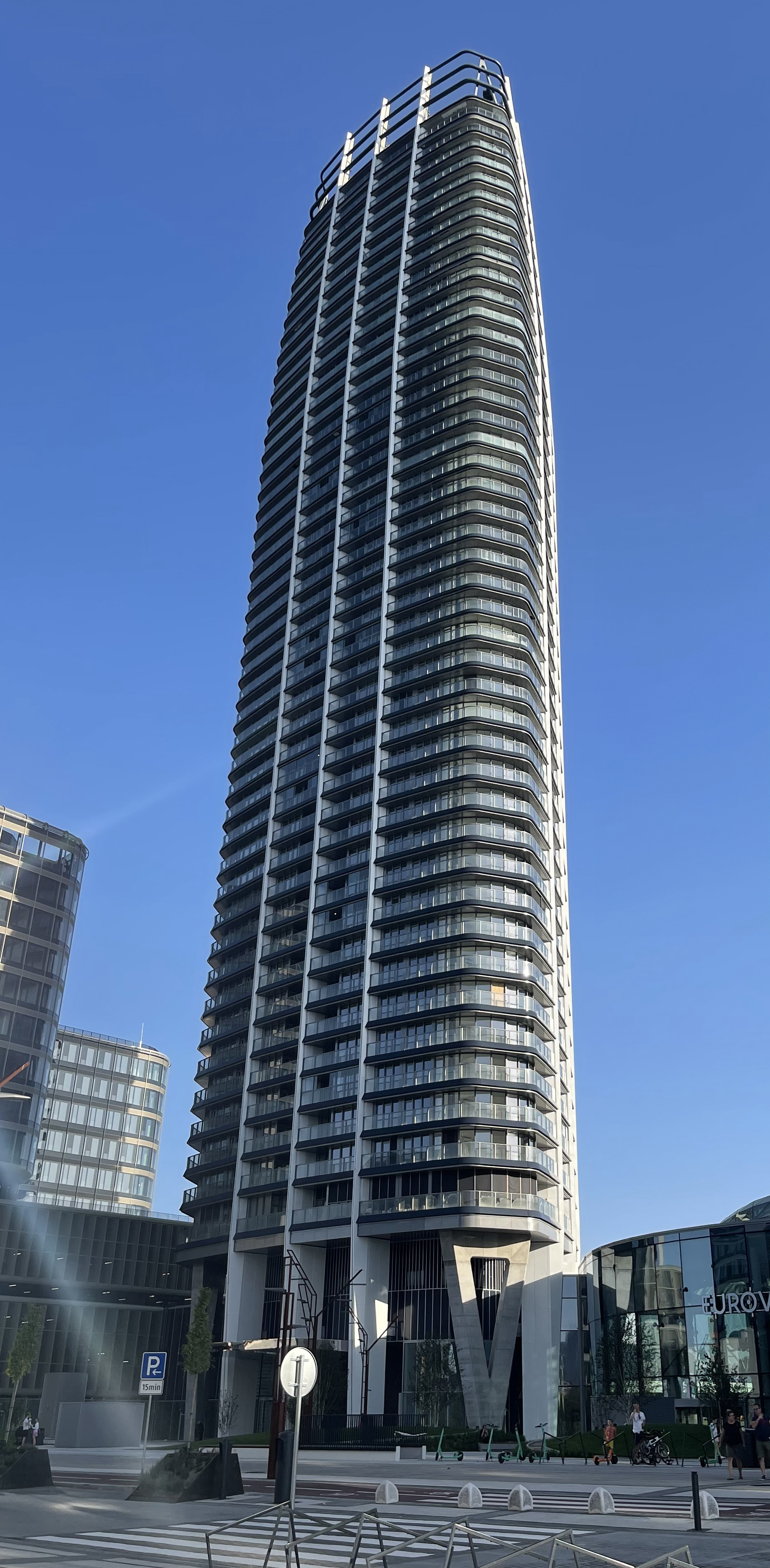
Eurovea Tower in Bratislava

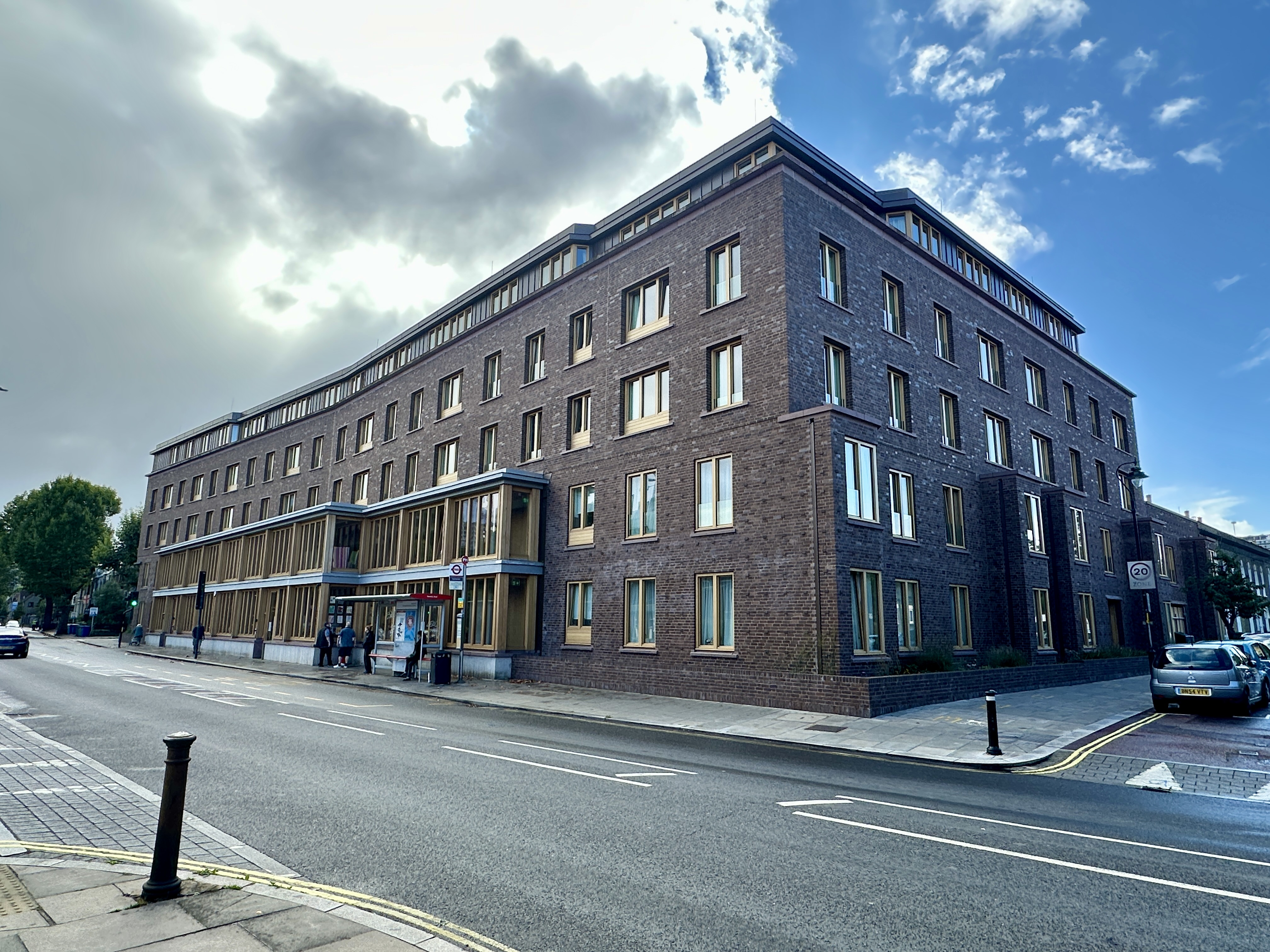
Appleby Blue Almshouses in Bermondsey

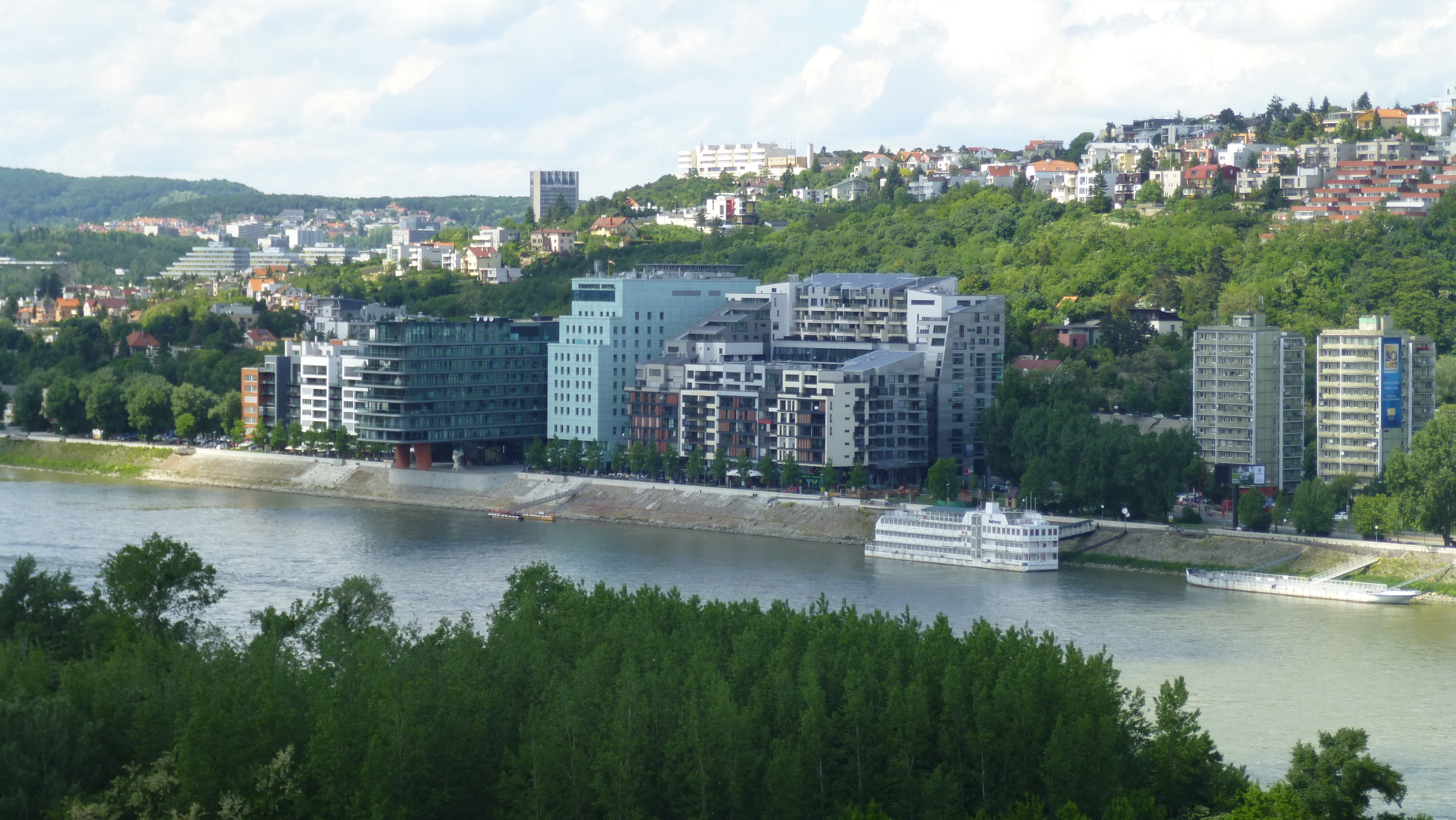
River Park in Bratislava

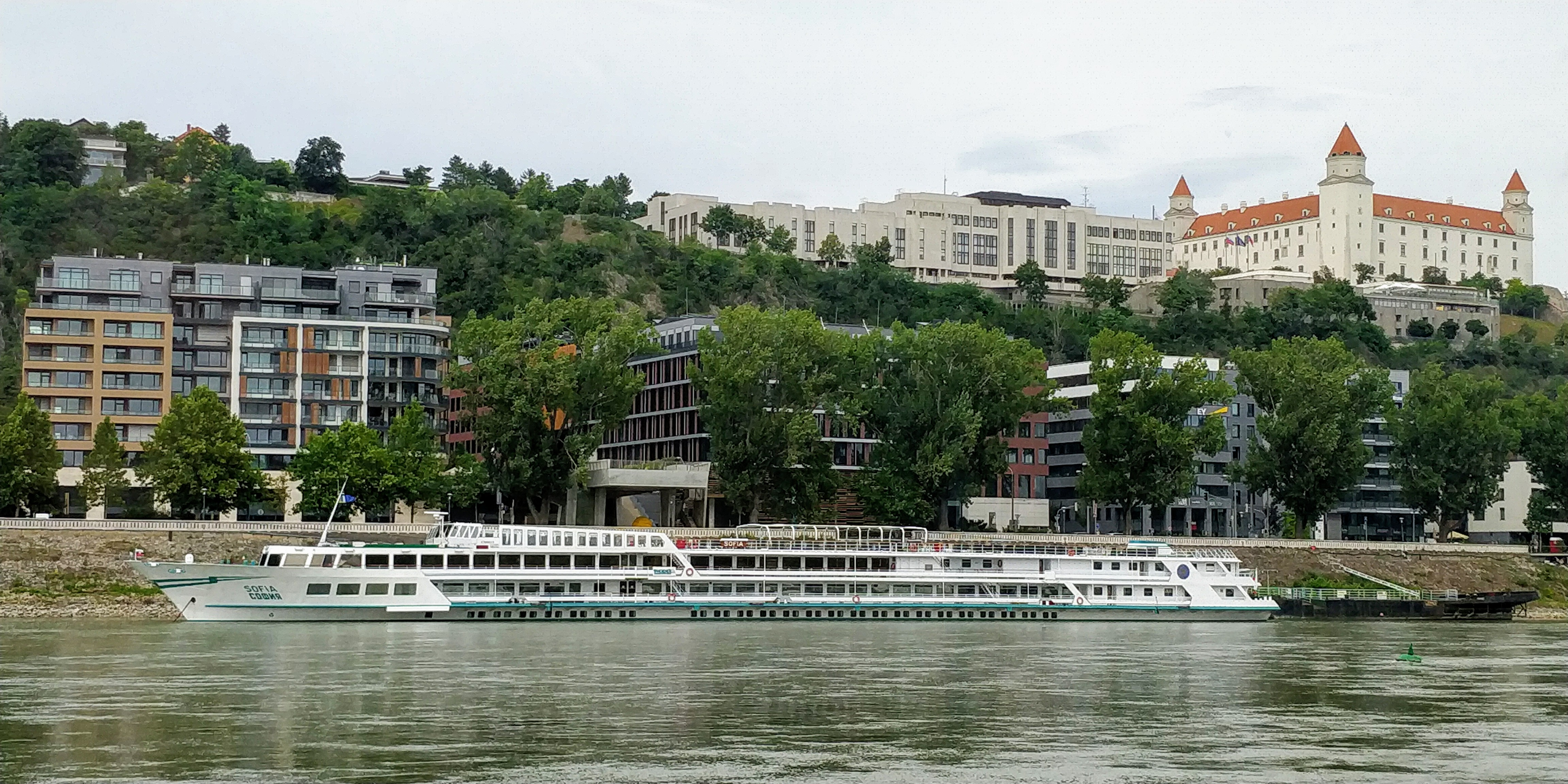
Zuckermandel in Bratislava

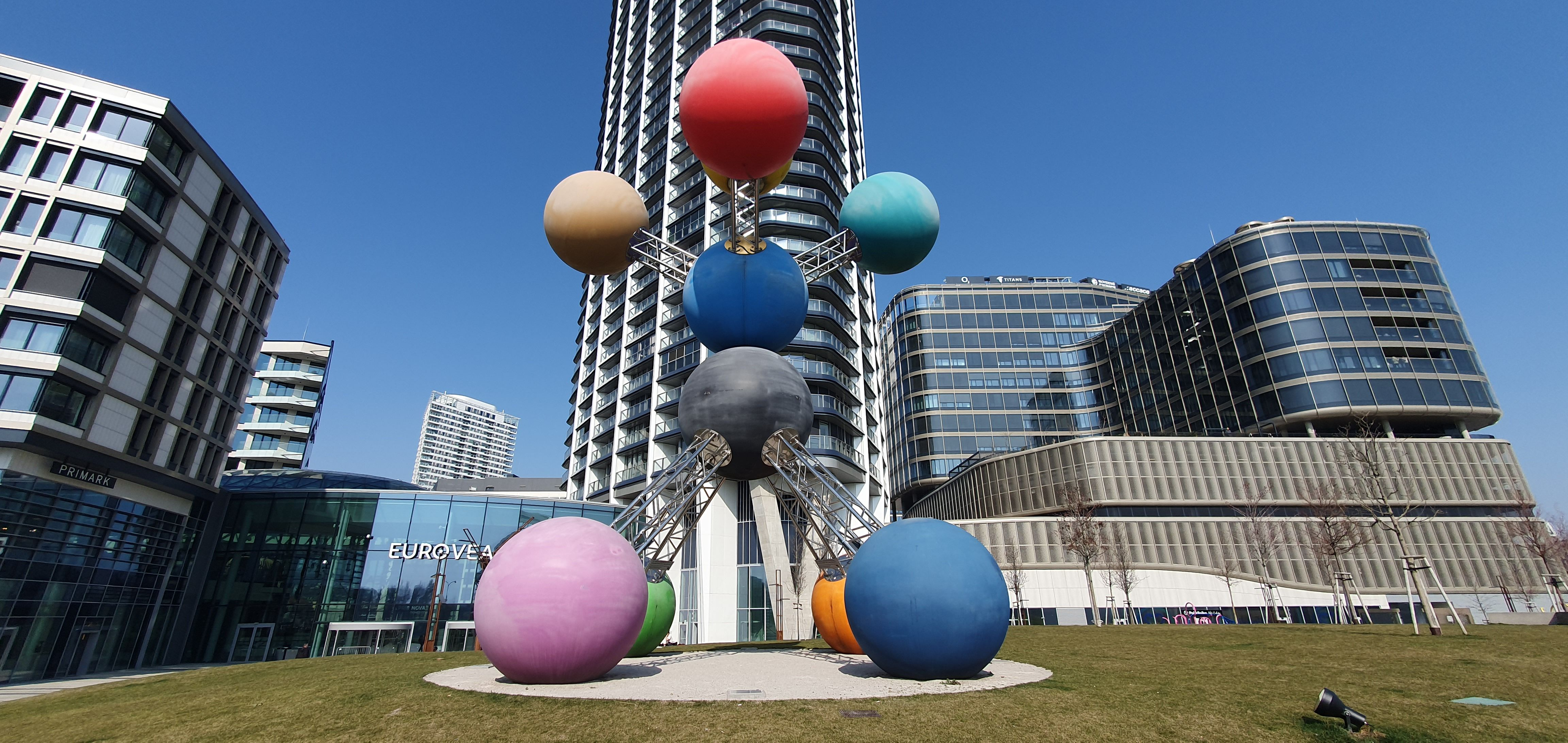
Eurovea extension in Bratislava

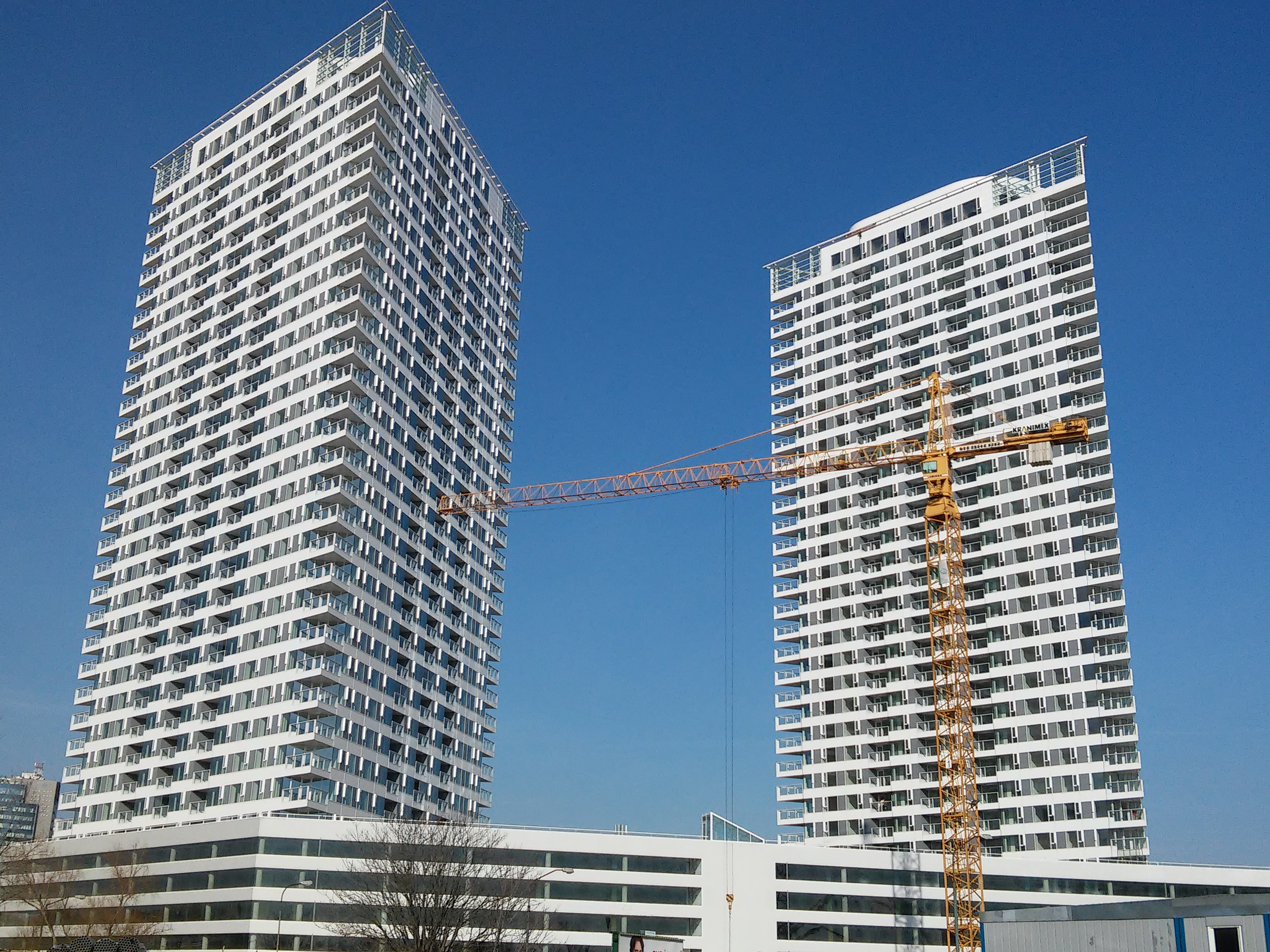
Panorama Towers in Bratislava

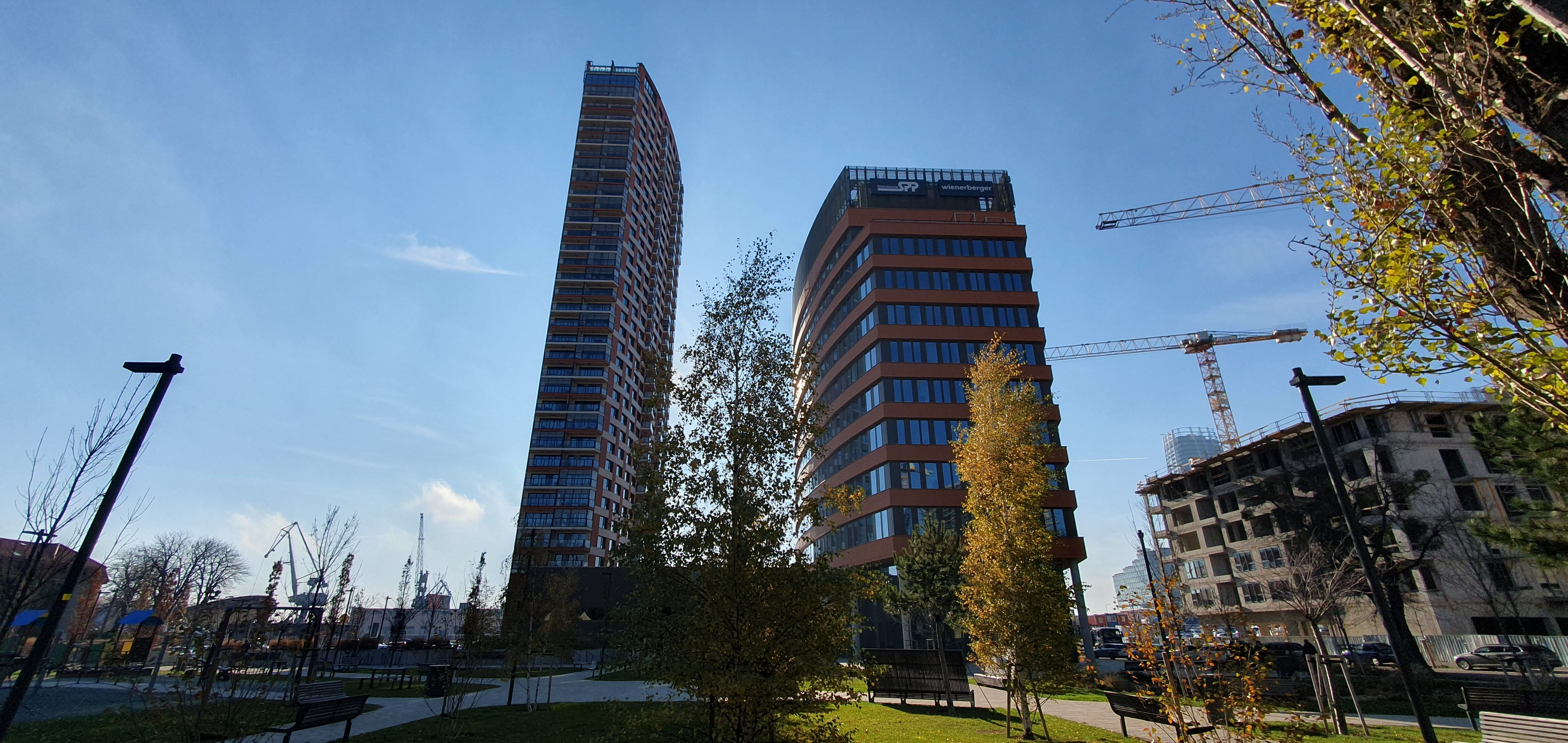
Klingerka in Bratislava

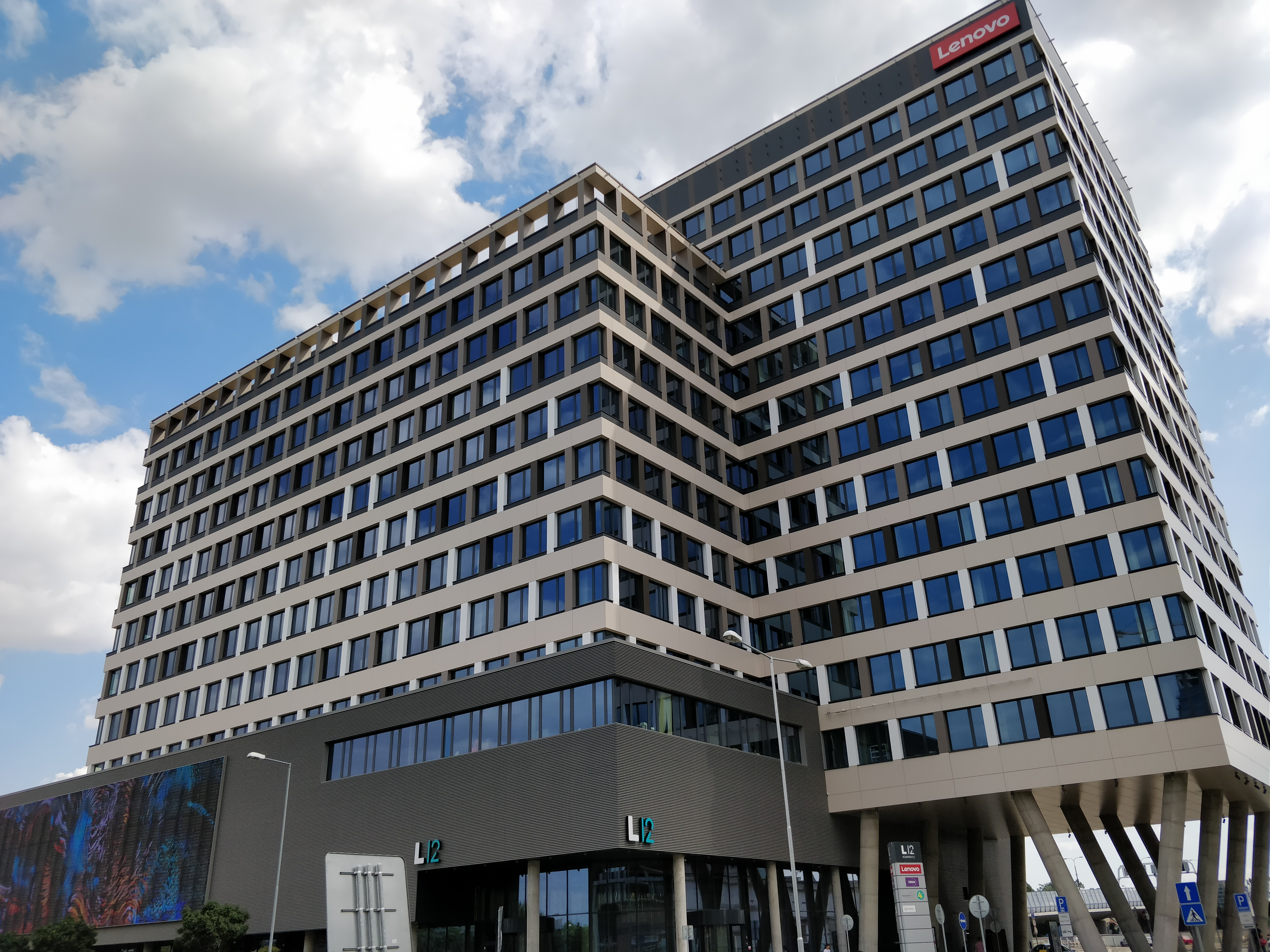
Landererova 12 in Bratislava

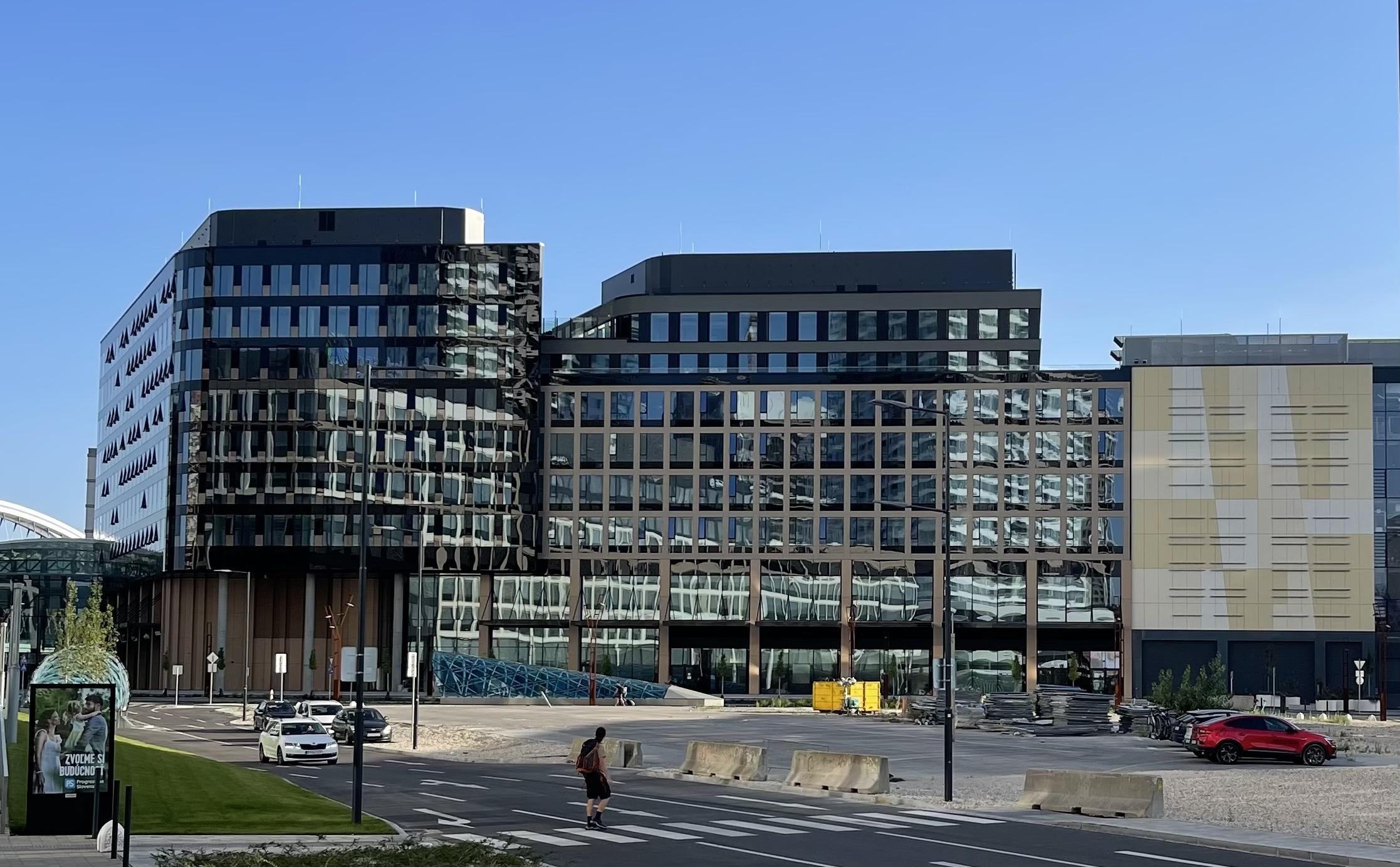
Pribinova 34 in Bratislava

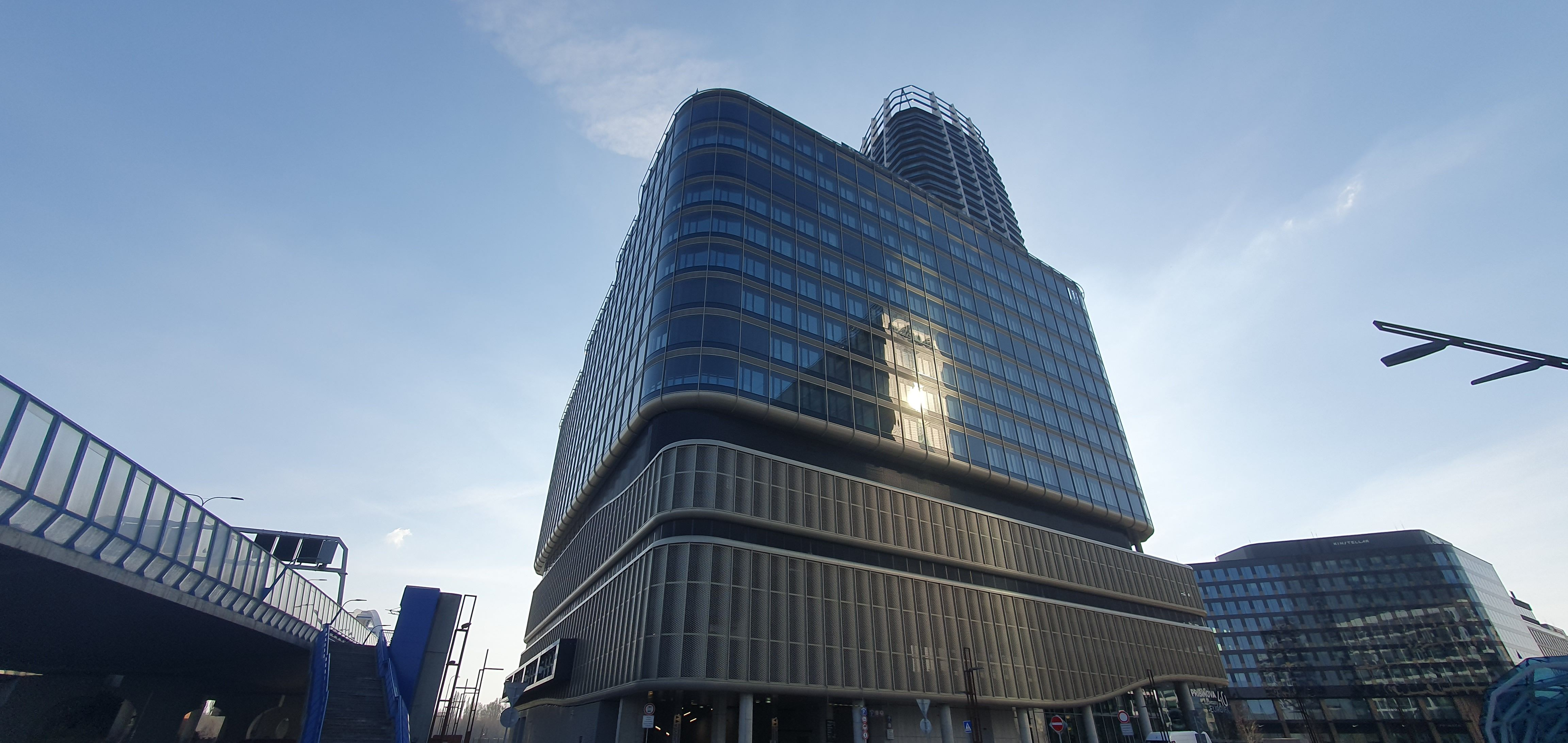
Pribinova 40 in Bratislava

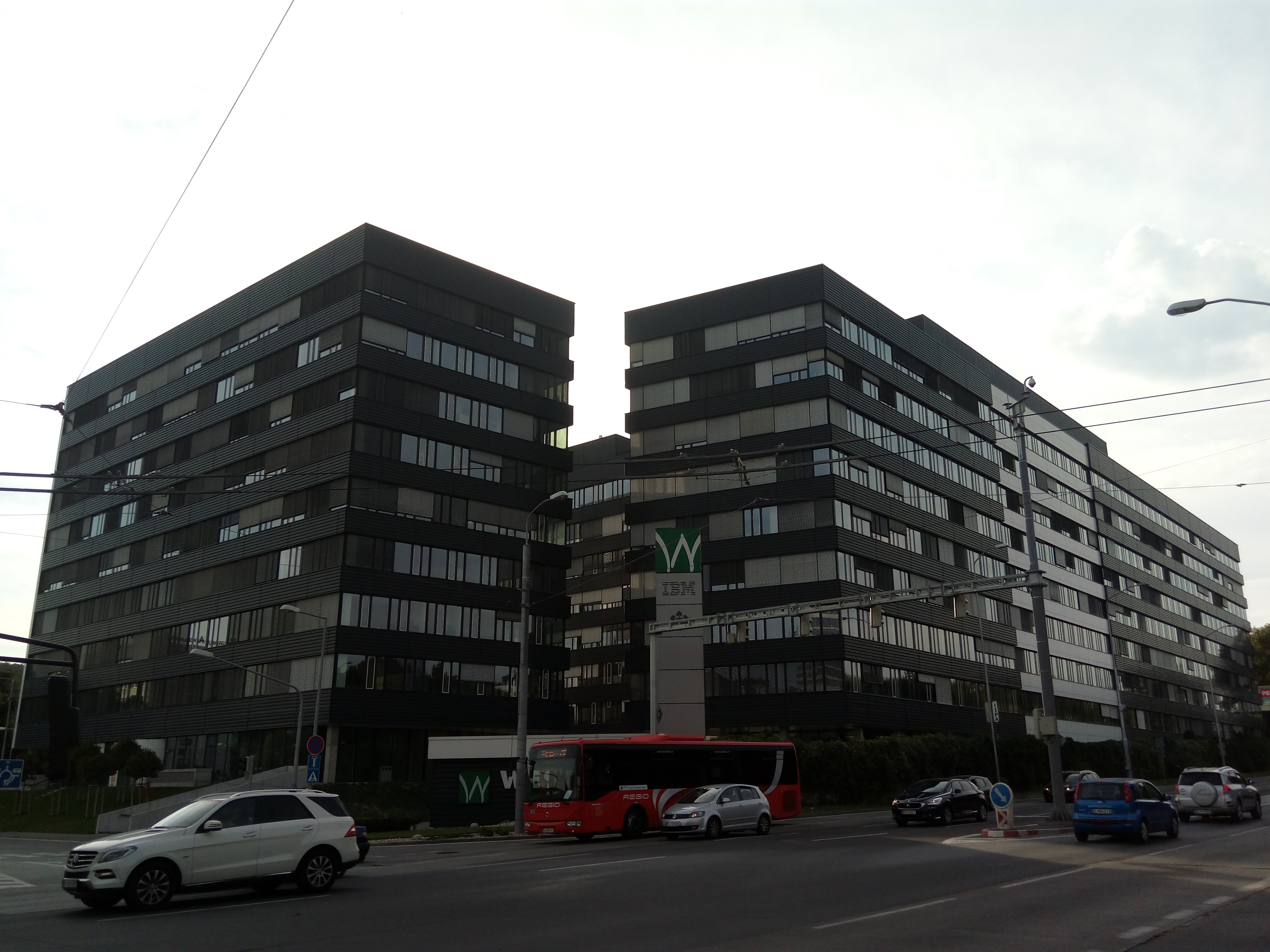
Westend in Bratislava

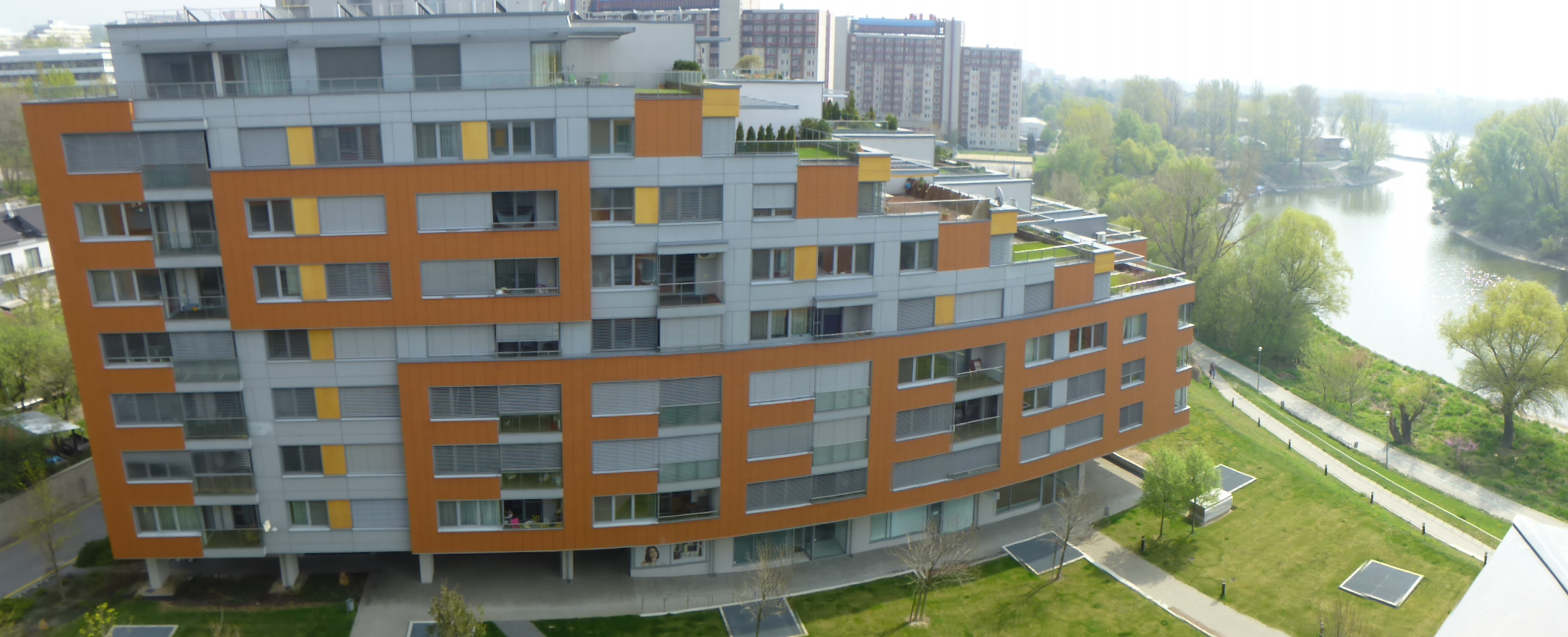
Karloveske rameno in Bratislava

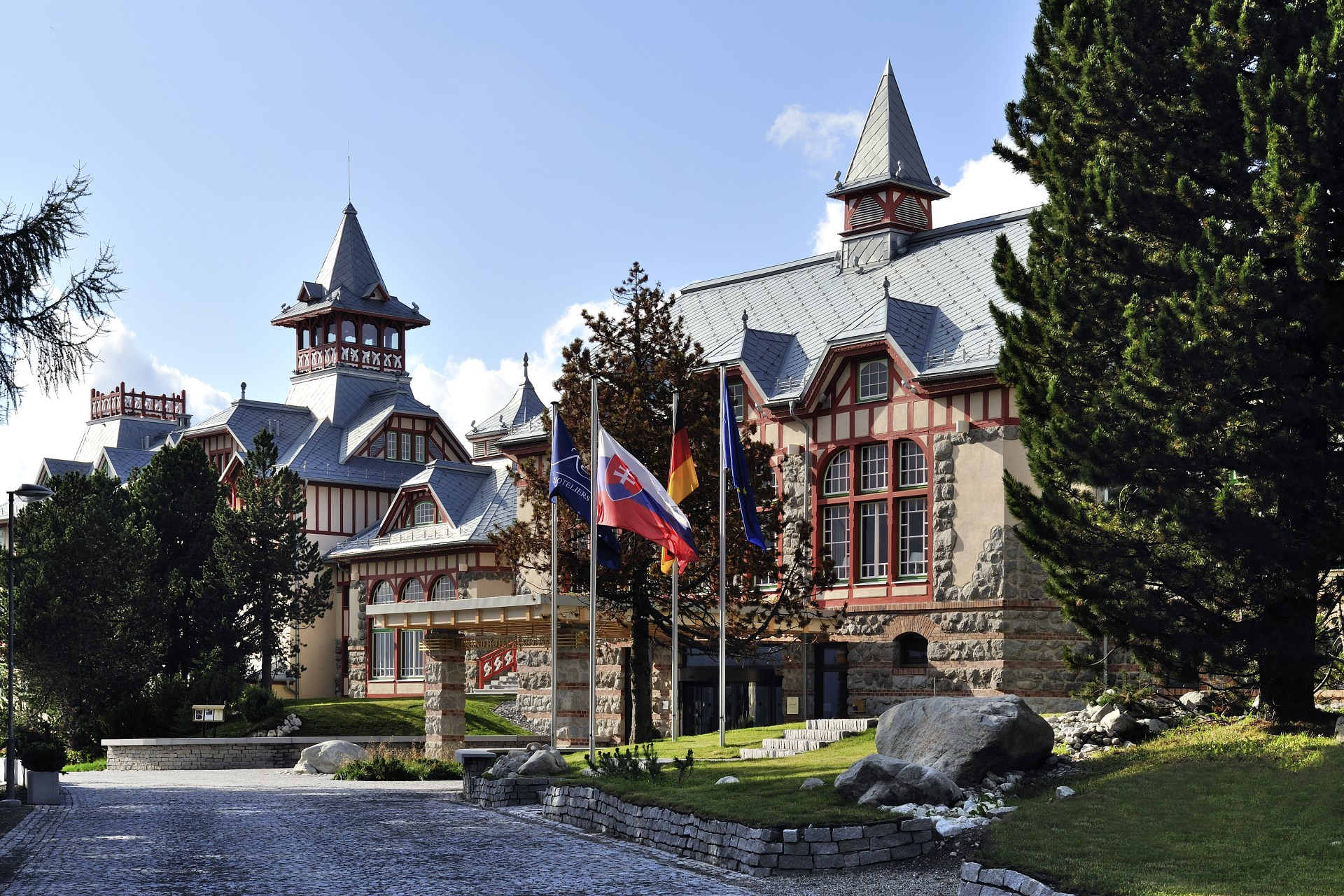
Grand Hotel Kempinski High Tatras in Slovakia

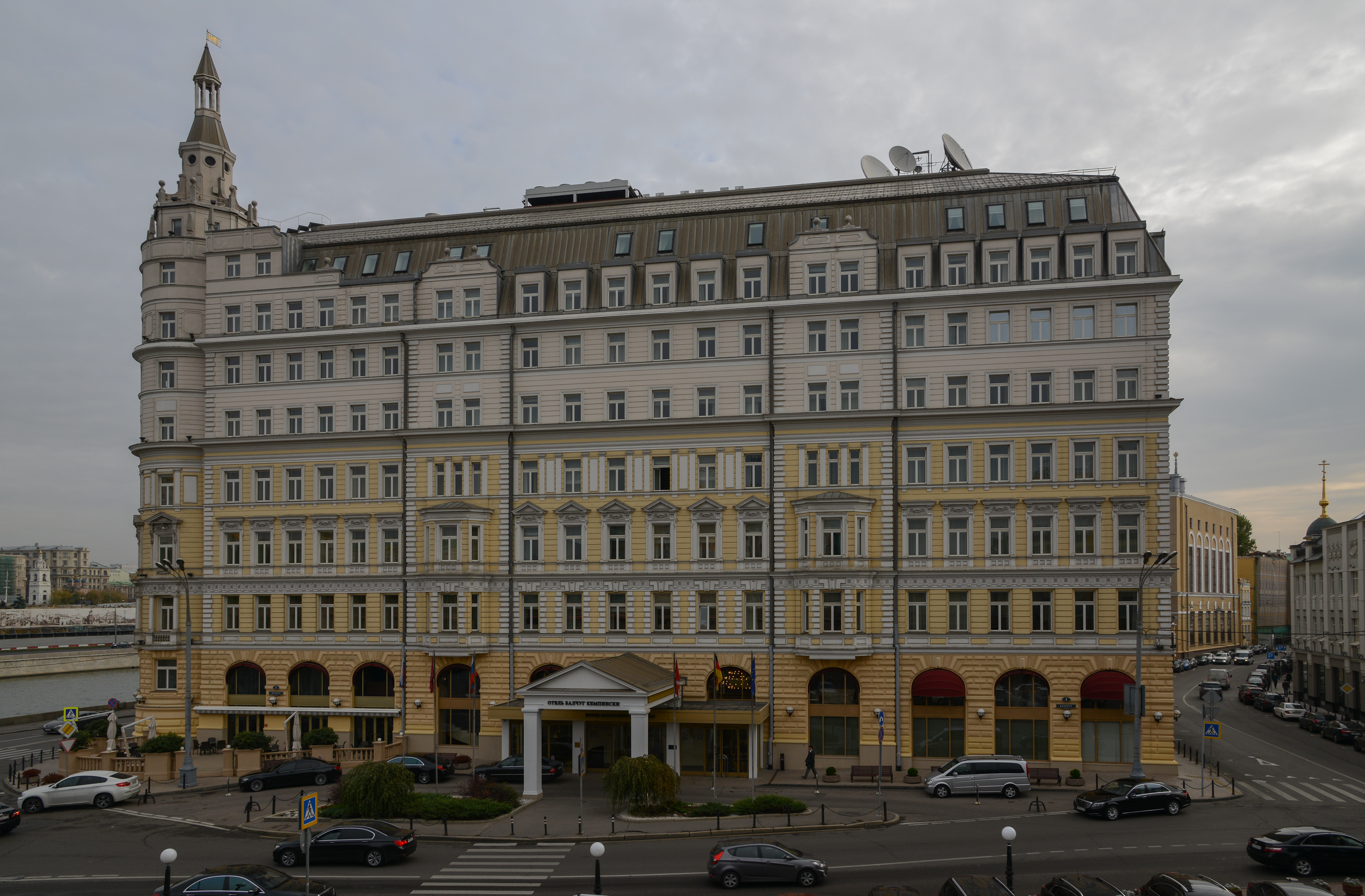
Hotel Baltschug Kempinski in Moscow

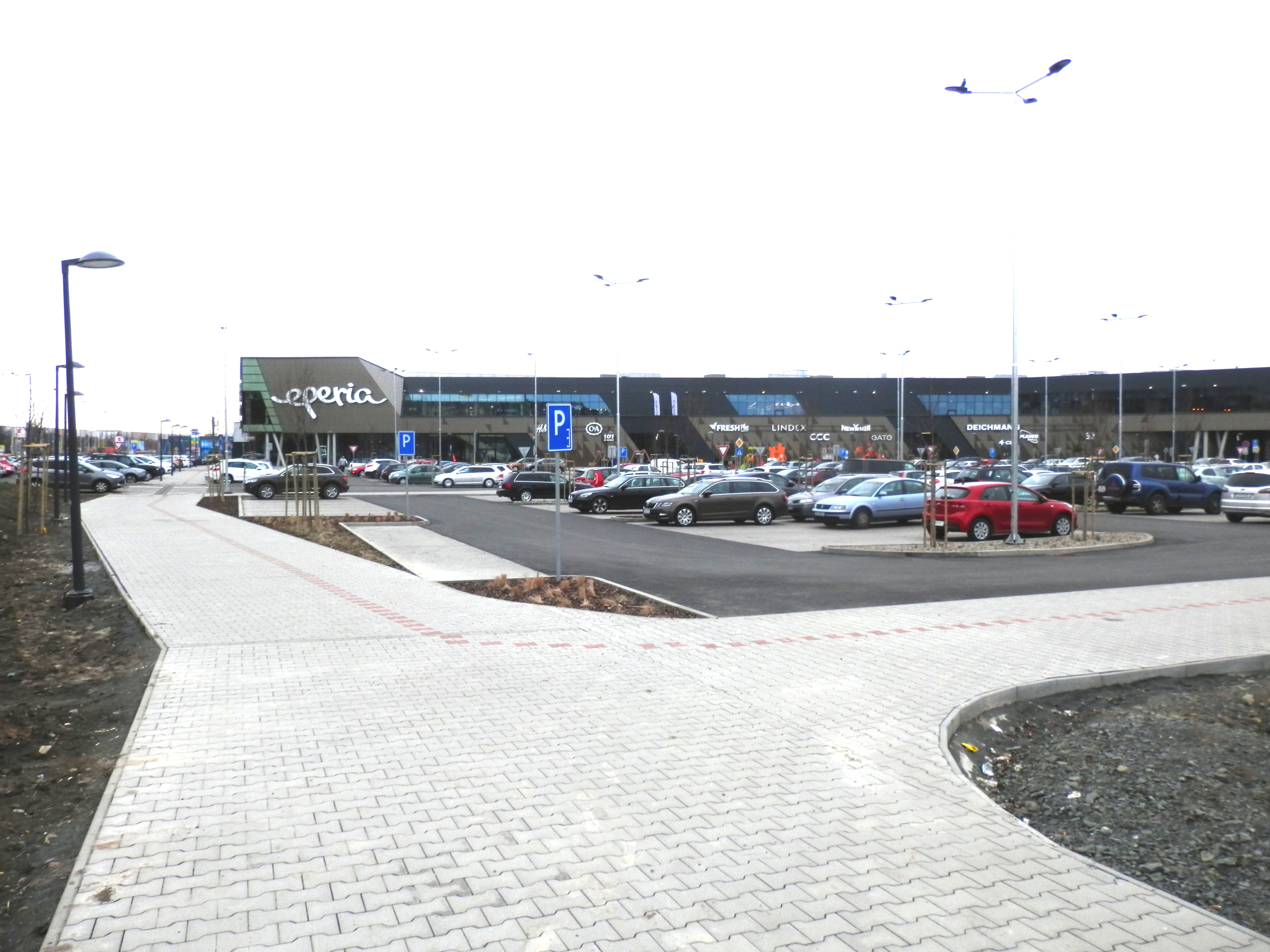
Eperia Shopping Mall in Prešov

Notable JTRE properties under construction include: 220 Blackfriars Road in London, Nordhafen Living & Office in Berlin and Downtown Yards in Bratislava. Notable planned projects include: Nové Lido, Pasienky, Majer Vajnory and the extension of River Park in Bratislava, Kempinski Grace Bay in Turks and Caicos Islands and Grand Residences Štrbské Pleso in the High Tatras.

== Corporate governance ==
Pavel Pelikán is the Executive Director of JTRE. Nigel Fleming is the Managing Director of JTRE London. Lukáš Sásik is the Managing Director of JTRE Germany and the Director of International Operations for JTRE. J&T Real Estate Holding Limited board of directors consists of: Peter Korbačka (chairman), Pavel Pelikán, Peter Remenár, Juraj Kalman, Peter Píš and Michal Borguľa.

== See also ==
- Economy of Slovakia
- JTRE London
- J&T
