= Copella =

British fruit juice company

- Company type: Subsidiary
- Industry: Beverage
- Founded: 1969; 57 years ago
- Headquarters: Boxford, U.K.
- Products: Fruit juices
- Parent: Tropicana (1998–pres.)
- Website: copellafruitjuice.co.uk

Copella is a British fruit juice company located south of Boxford, Suffolk. It was founded in 1969. In 1991 the family bought the company back from Taunton Cider Company. The brand is now owned by Tropicana, part of PepsiCo Beverages and Foods North America.

== History ==
Copella's name and success stems from the late Devora Peake, who died in 1999. She was the daughter of Russian parents living in Tel Aviv. After finishing university there, she set up home in the heart of the Suffolk countryside in the 1930s, and with her first husband, Bernard Loshak, started a farm handling and selling soft fruits, which she continued with her second husband, Bill Peake.

After 30 years, the family bought a fruit press and began producing juice, introducing their first beverage, fresh apple juice, which was not made from concentrate and contained no added water. The family named it Copella.

The name 'Copella' comes from the first letters of Cox's Orange Pippins, one of the main varieties of apples used in the juice, and the last part of Devora Peake's youngest daughter's name—CarmELLA.

The company was bought by Tropicana in 1998, which was in turn acquired by PepsiCo in 1999.
