= WhatHouse? =

- Company type: [Limited]
- Industry: Internet & Real Estate
- Founded: 1987
- Headquarters: London, United Kingdom
- Key people: Daniel Hill, Managing Director; Derek Smith, Chairman; Rupert Bates, Editorial Director; Neil Robbins, Director; Ian Cunningham, Commercial Director; Lee Williams, Non-Executive Director
- Services: Property search & Research
- Website: www.whathouse.com

WhatHouse? is a UK property portal, featuring new homes property for sale across the UK from most major home builders in the UK.

== History ==
Founded as a magazine in 1978 to provide consumers with information on new homes for sale, as well as interiors and gardens, WhatHouse? was acquired by its present owners in 1988, when it merged with homefinder magazine. WhatHouse? moved online in 2005, becoming www.whathouse.com.

WhatHouse? is owned by independent publisher WhatHouse Digital Ltd. Its sister company, Globalspan Media Ltd publishes Show House magazine, a monthly magazine for housebuilders and organises the annual WhatHouse? Awards.

== Interface ==
The www.whathouse.com portal allows potential buyers to browse and search through a range of new properties. It covers the affordable housing options for first-time buyers and key workers, such as shared equity shared ownership. There are daily property news and site reviews.

In July 2012, whathouse.com announced a 3-year sponsorship deal with Wolverhampton Wanderers F.C., where the brand name appeared on players' shirts for all first team games.

== The WhatHouse? Awards ==
The WhatHouse? Awards, an annual housebuilder awards ceremony which judges the best new homes in the UK, is also part of the WhatHouse? brand and the 34th such ceremony will take place in November 2015.

The WhatHouse? Awards are the longest established new homes awards in the UK. They reward housebuilders and developers across 21 categories.
