= Vlerick =

Vlerick is a surname. Notable people with the surname include:

- André Vlerick (1919–1990), Belgian politician, businessman and academic
- Philippe Vlerick (born 1955), Belgian businessman, nephew of André

== See also ==
- Vlerick Leuven Gent Management School, business school in Belgium
