= Noël Devisch =

Belgian businessman (born 1943)

- Born: 6 March 1943 (age 83); Bruges
- Education: Agricultural engineering from the Katholieke Universiteit Leuven; Master of Science in agricultural management from the University of Reading; PhD in agricultural economics from the University of Missouri

Noël, Baron Devisch (born 6 March 1943, in Bruges) is a Belgian businessman and former President of the Boerenbond (Belgian Catholic Farmers Union) in Leuven. He was succeeded by Piet Vanthemsche.

== Education ==
He obtained a degree in agricultural engineering from the Katholieke Universiteit Leuven (KUL), and a Master of Science in agricultural management from the University of Reading (Reading, United Kingdom), and a PhD in agricultural economics from the University of Missouri, Missouri (United States).

== Career ==
He started his professional career in 1967 as a researcher at the Institut économique agricole in Brussels, where he would stay until 1972 and again from 1976 until 1978. From 1972 until 1975, he was Assistant at the University of Missouri (United States). From 1979 until 1980, he was a member of the Cabinet of Belgian Agriculture Minister Albert Lavens. From 1981 until 1984 he was a European Commission official in Brussels. From 1985 until 1988, he was a member of the Cabinet Frans Andriessen, vice-president of the European Commission. In 1989, he was a member of the Cabinet of the European Commissioner Ray Mac Sharry.

In 1989 he became a member of the executive committee of the Belgian Boerenbond and he became its vice-president on 1 June 1992 until 31 October 1995. He became President of the organization on 1 November 1995. In addition he was Chairman of the Boerenbond, and of SBB Servicegroup (accountancy) and the Maatschappij voor Roerend Bezit van de Belgische Boerenbond cv (MRBB), the holding company of the Boerenbond. He became Director of Almanij in 1998 and became a member of its Management Committee in 2004 until 2005 when Almanij ceased to exist as a separate entity when it merged with KBC to form the KBC Group. Noël Devisch is also Director of KBC Insurance and a former regent of the National Bank of Belgium.

== Sources ==
- Noël Devisch
- NBB succession
