= Luc Debaillie =

Belgian businessman

Luc Debaillie is a Belgian businessman.

He is the chairman and managing director of Voeders Debaillie, and chairman of the board of directors of De Vervoersverzekeringen. He was appointed director of Almanij in 1976 and when in 2005, Almanij merged with KBC to form the KBC Group, he became a member of the board of the new group. Together with several other families of the Almanij group, he was one of the investors in the Asphales holding of Piet Van Waeyenberge.

== Sources ==
- De geschiedenis van N.V. Voeders Debaillie
- DE VERANKERAARS VAN KBC GROEP: wie is wie?
- Raad van bestuur nieuwe KBC Groep
