= Van Waeyenberge =

Van Waeyenberge is a Dutch surname. Notable people with the surname include:

- Jozef Van Waeyenberge (fl. 1995), Belgian businessman, brother of Piet
- Piet Van Waeyenberge (born 1938), Belgian businessman
