= KBC Bank Bulgaria =

Bulgarian universal bank

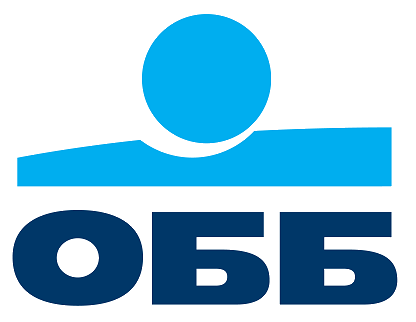
- Formerly: Raiffeisenbank (Bulgaria) EAD
- Industry: Financial services
- Founded: 1994
- Headquarters: Sofia, Bulgaria
- Total assets: 6 450.20 mln BGN (2015)
- Total equity: €460.79 mln (2015)
- Number of employees: over 3,000 (as of December 2010)
- Parent: KBC Group (since 2022)
- Website: www.ubb.bg/ubb-kbc-bank

On 10th of April 2023, UBB and KBC Bank Bulgaria officially united after the re-organization of KBC Bank Bulgaria EAD, through its merger into United Bulgarian Bank AD, was entered in the Commercial Register. The legal merger is the next step in the integration of the two banks after the Belgian KBC Group acquired the business of Raiffeisen Bank International in Bulgaria in the summer of 2022.

KBC Bank Bulgaria (previously known as Raiffeisenbank (Bulgaria) EAD) is fully licensed bank with operations in Bulgaria and abroad. KBC Bank Bulgaria is a universal bank, providing a full range of banking products and services to large corporate customers, small and medium-sized enterprises, retail clients and institutional clients.

As of 30 December 2010 total assets amounted to BGN 6.56 billion ranking it as the fourth largest bank in the country. Over 3000 employees of service more than 730 000 customers through a network of 188 branches. The bank has also built an Agent Network of mobile bank consultants.

KBC Bank Bulgaria is a 100% subsidiary of Belgium based KBC Group. KBC Group is a multi-channel bank-insurer, focusing on private clients and small and medium-sized enterprises in Belgium, Bulgaria, Czech Republic, Hungary, and Slovakia.

== History ==
The bank was established in 1994 under the Bulgarian Law on Banking and Credit Activities.

On July 8, 2022 the bank was acquired by Belgium KBC Group from Austria's Raiffeisen Bank and rebranded as KBC Bulgaria.

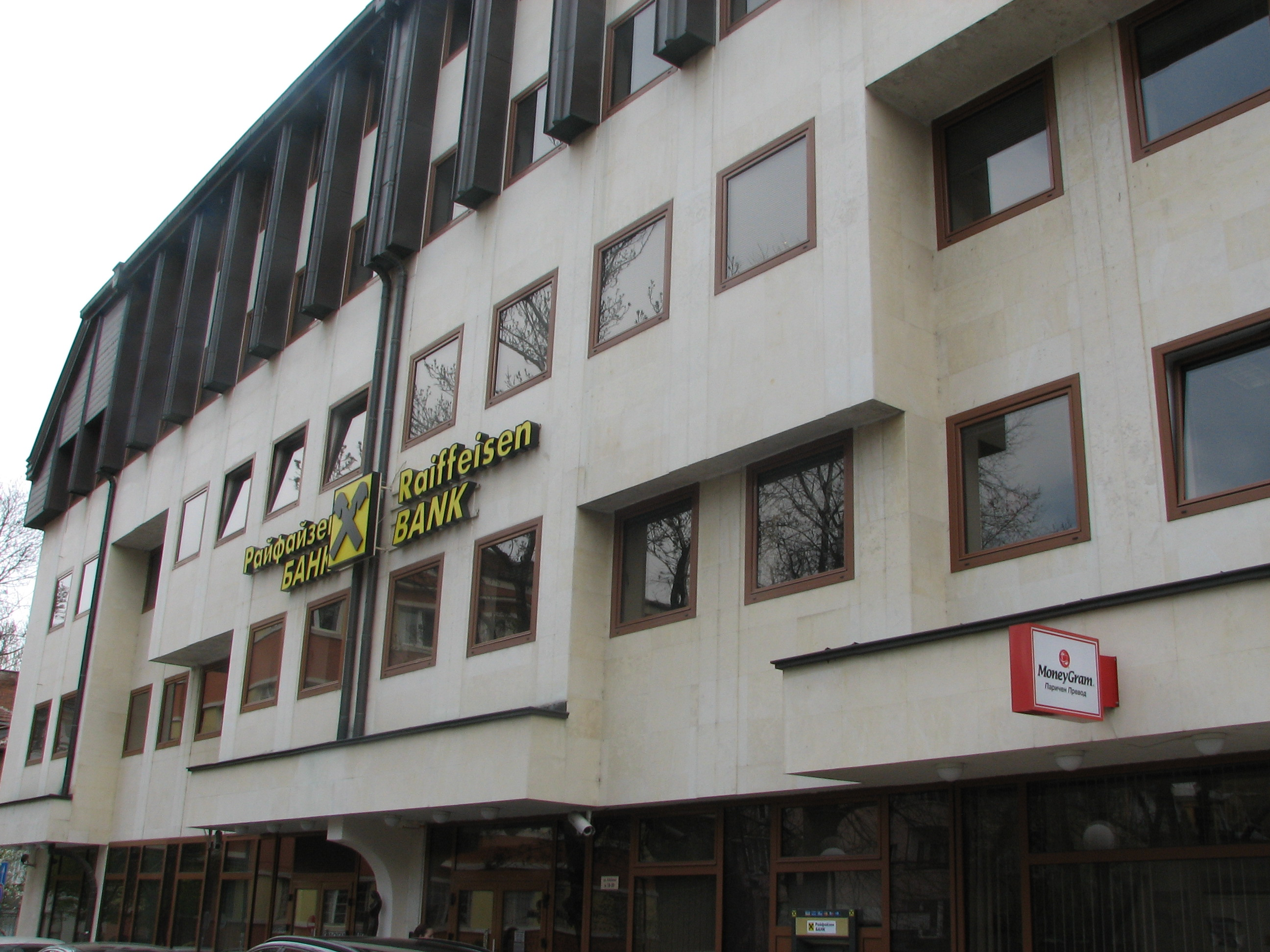
Headquarters of Raiffeisenbank Bulgaria in Sofia

On 10th of April 2023, UBB and KBC Bank Bulgaria officially united after the re-organization of KBC Bank Bulgaria EAD, through its merger into United Bulgarian Bank AD, was entered in the Commercial Register.

== Awards ==
- "Bank of the Year" awards - prizes in the “Efficiency” and Mystery Shopper categories (Bank of the Year Association)
- Award in the "Best campaign" category for the "Choose to help" donation campaign of Raiffeisenbank (Workshop for Civic Initiatives Foundation)
- 2nd place in the category "Socially significant PR campaign of a business organization" of the PR Prize 2012 competition for the "Choose to Help" donation campaign (Bulgarian Public Relations Society)
- First prize in Investor in Society category of the BBLF Responsible Business Awards 2011 (Bulgarian Business Leaders Forum)
- “Mystery Shopper” award in the “Bank of the Year” 2010 Contest (Bank of the Year Association)
- Most Generous Donor in 2010 (Bulgarian Donors Forum)
- “Investor in Society” award 2010 (Bulgarian Business Leaders Forum
- ENGAGE award to recognize the employer engagement in the social policy of Raiffeisenbank in 2010 (International Business Leaders Forum)
- “Encouragement of Donations” award 2010 (Human Resources in Bulgaria and EU Integration Foundation during its “Social Services Manager” awards)
- “Bank of the Year” 2002, 2003 and 2007), together with a “Bank of the Customer” 2004 of Pari daily
- “Bank of the Year” 2005, 2006, 2008 of The Banker
- “Best bank” in Bulgaria 2005, 2008 of Global Finance
- “Best Foreign Bank in Bulgaria” 1996, 1997, 1999 and 2000) of Euromoney
- “Best International Bank” of Central European, 1998 and 1999
- “Bulgarian Bank of Decade” 1999 of Central European
- “EUR Straight-Through Processing (STP) Excellence” award) for eight years in a row for the period 2004-2011 of Deutsche Bank

== Corporate social responsibility ==
KBC Bank Bulgaria's donation initiative “Choose to help” which started in 2009 earlier before that is part of the bank's corporate social responsibility policy and aims at supporting charity initiatives in four basic categories: health, ecology, social projects and projects in the field of education and culture.
