= J&T Group =

European financial services company

J&T Finance Group SE
- Type: Societas Europaea
- Industry: Financial services
- Founded: 1994
- Founders: Ivan Jakabovič and Patrik Tkáč
- Headquarters: Prague, Czech Republic
- Key people: Patrik Tkáč (chairman); Ivan Jakabovič (deputy chairman); Jozef Tkáč (supervisory board chairman)
- Services: Private banking, retail banking, asset management, investment banking, project finance
- Net income: €321.0 million (2025)
- Total assets: €17.1 billion (2025)
- Total equity: €2.63 billion (2025)
- Owner: Jozef Tkáč (45.05%); Ivan Jakabovič (35.15%); Rainbow Wisdom Investment Limited (9.9%); Štěpán Ašer (4.95%); Igor Kováč (4.95%)
- Website: www.jtfg.com

J&T Finance Group SE is a European joint-stock company headquartered in Prague, Czech Republic, operating predominantly in Central and Eastern Europe. It was founded in 1994.

The group provides comprehensive services in private and retail banking, asset management for private clients and institutions, investment banking, and project finance.

As of 2024, J&T Finance Group reported total assets of €17.9 billion, equity of €2.47 billion, and a net profit of €338.4 million – the highest in the group's history.

The group's shareholders are Jozef Tkáč (45.05%), Ivan Jakabovič (35.15%), Rainbow Wisdom (a subsidiary of Chinese state conglomerate CITIC, 9.9%), and senior managers Štěpán Ašer and Igor Kováč (4.95% each).

== History ==
J&T Group was founded in 1994 in Slovakia by Ivan Jakabovič and Patrik Tkáč, both former classmates. Their first major project was the development of luxury housing on Drotárska Street in Bratislava, Slovakia. An important milestone for the young company was the purchase of investment fund Creditanstalt IF in 1996. The company specialized in the Czech Republic and Slovakia, but the group also invested in the markets of Switzerland, Canada, Mexico and the Caribbean.

In 2022, J&T Banka acquired an 80% majority stake in Amista, one of the largest Czech managers and administrators of funds for qualified investors.

In 2023, J&T Banka opened a branch in Frankfurt, Germany, operating under the brand J&T Direktbank and offering deposit products to German retail clients. Germany became the fourth market in which J&T Banka directly operates. Within its first year, J&T Direktbank attracted over 23,000 clients and deposits exceeding €1 billion.

In 2023, J&T Finance Group sold its Russian subsidiary J&T Bank AO to Bjurokrat holding, controlled by Russian bank Realist, thereby exiting the Russian market entirely. J&T had entered Russia in 2007 through the acquisition of Tretij Rim bank.

In 2025, J&T Banka established a representative office in Poland, providing loan financing to clients investing in the Polish market.

In 2025, J&T Finance Group agreed to sell its 98.45% stake in Slovak 365.bank (formerly Poštová banka) to Belgium's KBC Group, the parent company of ČSOB, for €761 million. The transaction was completed in January 2026 at a final consideration of €708 million, following regulatory approvals.

== Operations ==
J&T Finance Group provides financial services through the following entities:

Banking services are provided through J&T Banka. In the area of investments, the group operates through J&T Investiční společnost, Amista investiční společnost, and J&T Ventures. The group's flagship investment vehicle is J&T Arch Investments, a fund for qualified investors listed on the Prague Stock Exchange, which is the largest fund of its kind in the Czech Republic and Slovakia. Specialised financing and capital markets are covered by J&T Mezzanine and J&T IB and Capital Markets. Other activities, such as services in the areas of human resources, controlling, tax advisory, and accounting, are provided by J&T Services.
