= Gustave Sap =

Belgian politician

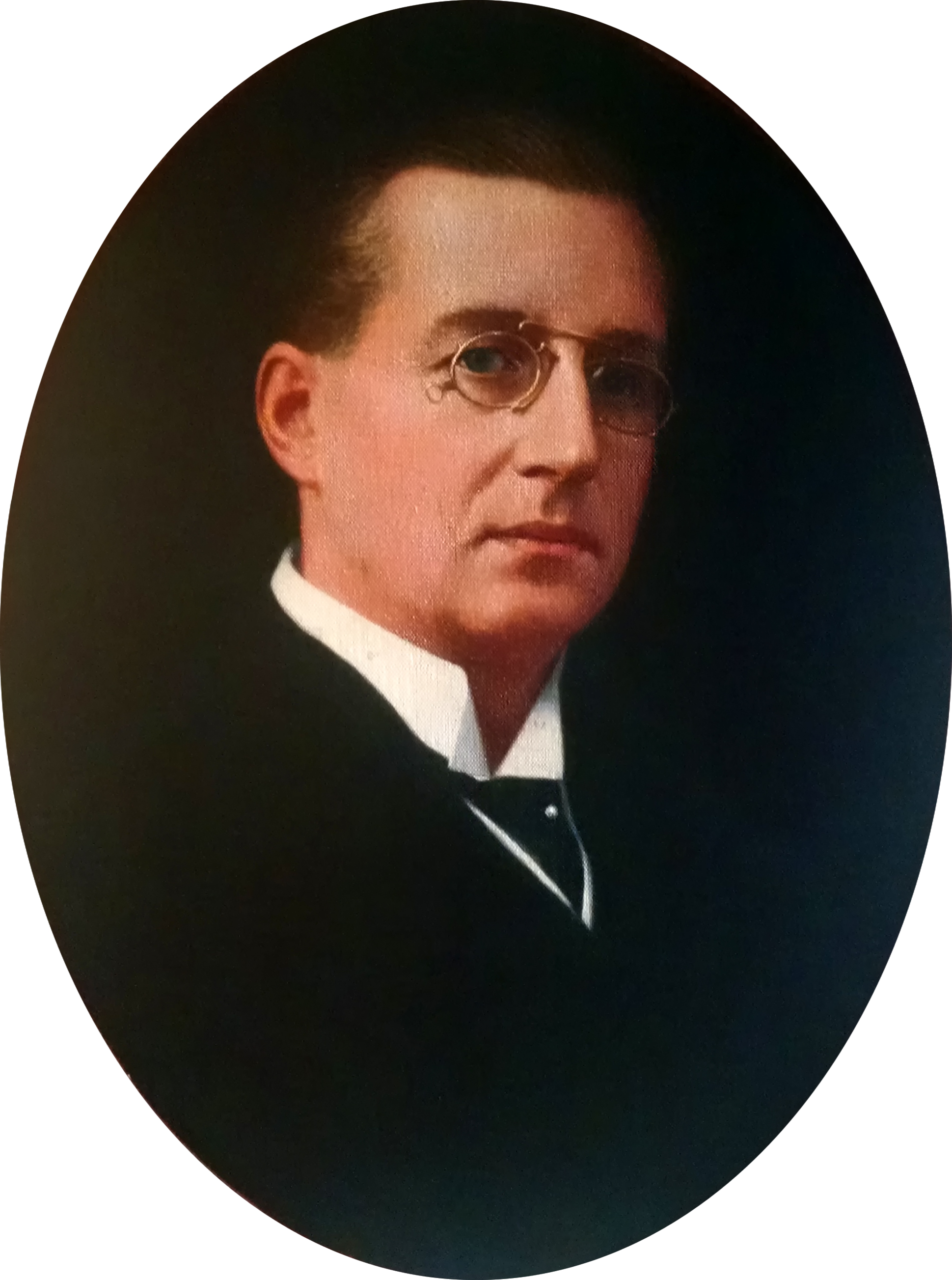
- Born: Gustave Charles Sap; 21 January 1886; Kortemark, Belgium
- Died: 19 March 1940 (aged 54); Brussels, Belgium
- Occupations: politician, professor

Gustave Charles Sap (21 January 1886 – 19 March 1940) was a Belgian politician and minister for the Catholic Party. Sap was also professor at the Catholic University of Leuven (Leuven, Belgium). During his professional career, he was active in the Flemish movement, agriculture and business. In 1920, he married Antoinette Gylsen, daughter of the Antwerp shipowner Henry Gylsen, and together they had five daughters and one son. Gustave Sap was the father-in-law of André Vlerick, Jan Piers and Albert De Smaele.

== Education ==
From 1901 until 1905, Sap attended the diocesan normal school in Torhout. He began his career as a teacher, but went on to study at the Catholic University of Leuven, where he graduated in 1911 in commercial and consular sciences. On 20 June 1912, he obtained a doctorate from Leuven with a thesis on German stock market regulation: Le régime légal des bourses en Allemagne. Lois du 22 juin 1896 et du 8 mai 1908.

== Career ==
Sap began his career as a teacher in 1905, which lasted until 1908. In 1913, he began teaching stock market transactions at the Hogere Handelsschool of the Catholic University of Leuven. After World War I, he progressed to lecturer, and in 1920, he became a professor in the law department of the university.

When World War I ignited, Sap fled to Le Havre, where he was the private secretary of Minister Joris Helleputte (agriculture and public works), President of the Boerenbond (Belgian Catholic Farmers Association) from March 1915 until November 1918. During the war, he continued his activities in the Flemish movement and supported the Vlaamse frontbeweging (E: Flemish frontmovement). After the war, he joined the Catholic Party instead of the Frontpartij, but remained sympathetic of its cause.

On 5 May 1919, he joined the management of the Catholic Leuvense Volksbank, and on 7 May 1921, he participated in the foundation of the Algemeene Bankvereeniging (ABV) in Antwerp. Since 1927, Sap was also owner of the Catholic daily De Standaard, which was founded by Frans Van Cauwelaert, Alfons Van de Perre and Arnold Hendrix in 1919 with his financial support, when he acquired the majority of its shares. He would use the newspaper as a political instrument and move it to a more radical Flemish point of view.

From 1920 up to 1940 he was a member of parliament for the district Roeselare - Tielt, for the farmers of the Catholic Party. In 1931 he participated in opposing the Jamar government, but afterwards refused to join the Renkin government. On 23 May 1932 Renkin created a new government, which Sap joined this time. Sap was Minister of public work and of agriculture and tradespeople (1932–1934), Minister of Finance (1934), Minister of economy and trade (1939–1940) in the government of Hubert Pierlot.

As a Council member of the Catholic Boerenbond (E:Belgian Farmers Association) in 1934, he could not avoid the bankruptcy of the Middenkredietkas and the Algemeene Bankvereeniging due to the economic crisis and management issues. He came into conflict with Paul van Zeeland on economic aspects of the government policy and the National Bank of Belgium (speech of 16 March 1937). In 1937, he was temporarily ousted from the Catholic Party because of his sympathies for the extreme right Catholic parties and Leon Degrelle.

== Sources ==
- Gedenkboek Gustaaf Sap 1886-1940. Brussel, 1941.
- Gustave Sap (Dutch)
