= Istrobanka =

Slovak universal commercial bank

Istrobanka, a.s.
- Type: Public
- Industry: Financial services
- Founded: September 1992
- Defunct: July 1, 2009
- Fate: Merged with ČŠOB Slovakia
- Successor: ČŠOB Slovakia
- Headquarters: Bratislava, Slovakia
- Key people: Mag. Volker Pichler (CEO)
- Products: Banking, asset management, leasing
- Net income: € 4,41 million
- Number of employees: 772
- Website: www.istrobanka.sk

Istrobanka was a universal commercial bank based in Slovakia established in September 1992.

== History ==
Istrobanka's founding shareholder was Slovenská Poisťovňa (the Slovak Insurance Company). In 1993 the city of Bratislava, the capital city of Slovakia, became another shareholder. GiroCredit Bank AG of Austria became a third shareholder in 1994.

Effective March 2002, the Austrian bank BAWAG became the principal shareholder of Istrobanka, holding 100% of the shares. In July 2008 BAWAG formalized sale of Istrobanka to the Belgian group KBC Bank NV, making KBC the fourth largest bank in the Slovak market through its partnership with ČSOB.

== Branches ==
About 60 branches and sub-branches of Istrobanka were located throughout Slovakia.

1 July 2009 branches of Istrobanka were rebranded to ČSOB.

== See also ==
- List of banks in Slovakia
