= Piet Vanthemsche =

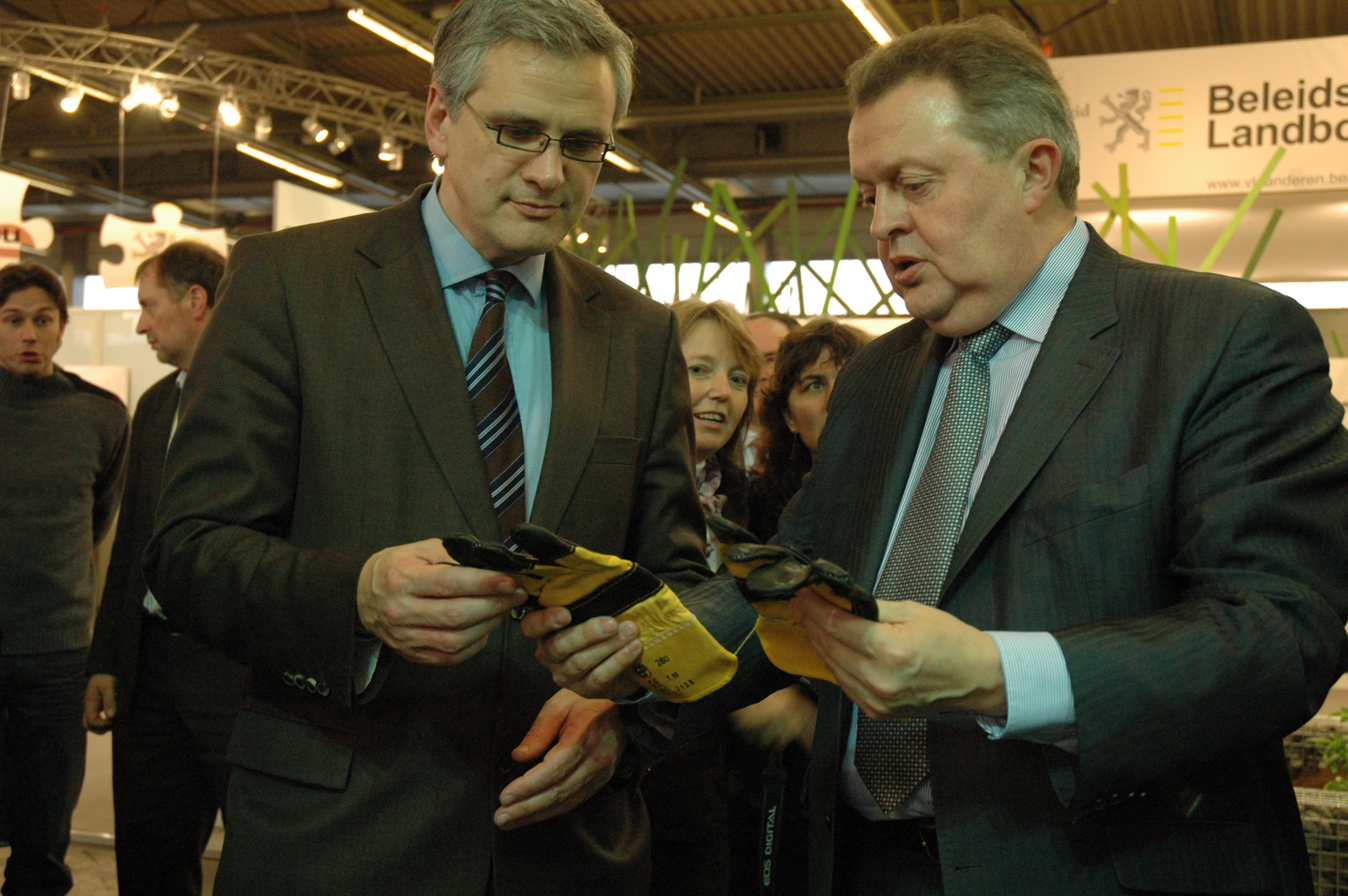
At the right, next to Kris Peeters.

Piet, Baron Vanthemsche (born 6 December 1955) is a Belgian veterinary surgeon and civil servant. In 2008, he succeeded Noël Devisch as President of the Boerenbond (E: Catholic Belgian Farmers Union) in Leuven.

== Education ==
Born in Kortrijk, he graduated as a veterinary surgeon at the University of Ghent (Ghent, Belgium).

== Career ==
From 1980 until 1986 he practiced as a veterinary surgeon in Tielt. From February 1986 until July 1992, he was veterinary inspector at the Belgian Department of Veterinary Services. From August 1992 until September 1994 he was Director at the Department, section animal diseases. From October 1994 until December 1997, Piet Vanthemsche was Director at the General Secretariat. From December 1997 until July 1999, he was Chef de Cabinet of the Minister of Agriculture and from July 1999 until February 2000, Advisor-General at the General Secretariat. From March 2000 until July 2002, he worked as self-employed Consultant. From July 2002 until July 2006, he was CEO of the Federal Agency for the Safety of the Food Chain (FAVV). From October 2006 until April 2007, he was Interministerial Commissioner Influenza. From July 2006 until April 2007, he was General Administrator of the Belgian Federal Agency for Medicines and Health Products after which he was succeeded by Xavier De Cuyper. From April 2007 until March 2008, he was Vice President of the Boerenbond after which he succeeded Noël Devisch as its President and as regent of the National Bank of Belgium.

== Sources ==
- (in Dutch) Piet Vanthemsche
- (in Dutch) Piet Vanthemsche (National Bank of Belgium)
- (in Dutch) Piet Vanthemsche verkozen tot voorzitter Boerenbond (De Tijd)
