= Československá obchodní banka =

Commercial bank operating in the Czech Republic

Československá obchodní banka, a.s.
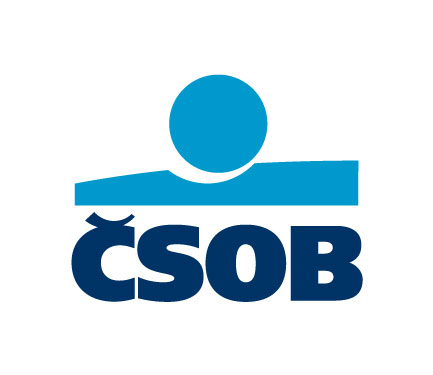
- Industry: Financial services
- Founded: 1964
- Headquarters: Prague, Czech Republic; Bratislava, Slovakia
- Number of locations: 235 branches + Czech post offices
- Area served: Czech Republic, Slovakia
- Key people: Aleš Blažek (CEO)
- Products: Banking, insurance, asset management, pension funds, leasing and factoring
- Revenue: CZK 40.474 billion (2022)
- Net income: CZK 14.6 billion (2022)
- Total assets: CZK 1,805.617 billion (2022)
- Owner: KBC Bank
- Number of employees: 8,105 (2022)
- Parent: KBC Bank
- Website: www.csob.cz www.csob.sk

Československá obchodní banka, a.s. (ČSOB) is one of the largest commercial banks operating in the Czech Republic. It is a universal bank that offers a full range of banking services to individuals and companies. It operates 280 ČSOB branded branches, and 3,300 Česká pošta (Czech postal company) branches under the brand name Poštovní spořitelna.

The bank is owned by Belgium-based KBC Bank. Until 2008 ČSOB also operated in Slovakia, but in 2008 a new company Československá obchodná banka, a.s. (ČSOB Slovakia) was created under direct control of KBC Bank. Czech ČSOB holds a 47% minority stake in Slovak ČSOB. Since 2011, the bank has sponsored the Czech ice hockey club HC Pardubice, which took the name HC ČSOB Pojišťovna Pardubice from 2011 to 2015.

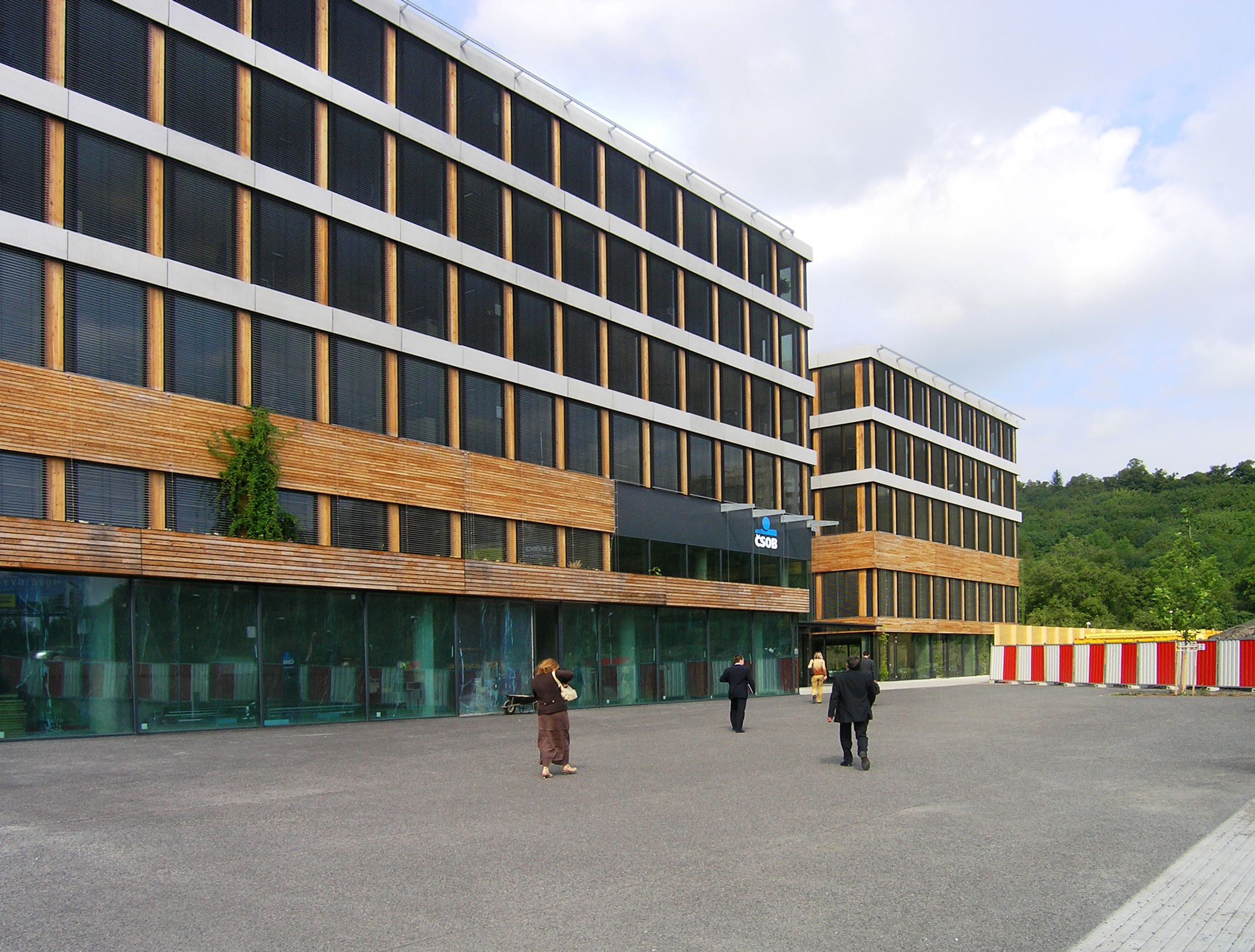
The administrative building of the Československá obchodní banka in Prague – Radlice by Josef Pleskot

== History ==
ČSOB was established in 1964 in the former Czechoslovakia as the sole bank providing foreign trade, financing and convertible currency operations. After 1989, ČSOB expanded its activity to include services for entrepreneurs and for individuals.

A major milestone in ČSOB's history was its privatisation in June 1999, when the Belgian KBC Bank (a member of the KBC Group NV) bought a 66% majority stake from the Czech government for 40 billion CZK. Later, in 1999, KBC bought a further 16.63% stake from the National Bank of Slovakia. At the same time the European Bank for Reconstruction and Development purchased 7.47% from the NBS.

Prior to acquiring its bankrupt competitor Investiční a poštovní banka in June 2000, ČSOB was the fourth-largest bank in the Czech Republic. The acquisition of Investiční a poštovní banka, at the time the third-largest Czech bank, brought an additional 3.3 million customers and a network of 179 branches.

Since 1 July 2008 ČSOB Slovakia has begun to merge with Istrobanka following the latter's acquisition by KBC.

In November 2009, KBC announced a plan to float 40% of ČSOB on the Prague Stock Exchange the following year.

In 2010 ČSOB established the Era brand wanting to attract younger customer, but was not able to do so and in 2015 started to advertise the brand together with its subsidiary Poštovní spořitelna.

In 2014 the CEO of ČSOB, Pavel Kavánek, who held the position for 20 years, was replaced by John Hollows. Kavánek went on to direct the supervisory board of ČSOB until Zdeněk Tůma took over the position in 2019. Hollows retired in 2022 after being with the KBC group for 25 years and was followed by Aleš Blažek, the former CEO of KBC Bank Ireland.

ČSOB bought the largest online travel insurance seller in the Czech Republic, Top-Pojištění, in 2016. At the time Top-Pojištění had 270,000 clients and stayed an independent insurance broker offering insurances from 13 different companies.

In 2019 ČSOB bought the remaining 45% of Českomoravská stavební spořitelna (ČMSS) from Bausparkasse Schwäbisch Hall (BSH) for 6.15 billion crowns. ČMSS had 1.3 million customers and was the largest provider of construction savings in the Czech Republic when it was taken over.

Because ČSOB refused to replace damaged banknotes in 2018 and 2019, the Czech National Bank (ČNB) fined the bank 1.5 million crowns in 2020.

In December 2020 ČSOB was sued by the TEP Praha company for withholding 1.3 billion CZK, which, according to TEP Praha, were meant to be invested into a railway hub near Košice in Slovakia. ČSOB withheld the funds due to their unclear origins as the listed address of the headquarters of TEP Praha were leading to a run-down building that was auctioned off earlier in 2020 and because the company was not active in the years before the lawsuit. The funds were later suspected to come from Russia in a money laundering scheme, since the Russian honorary consul of Slovakia had asked the Belgian honorary consul of Slovakia to investigate the withholding of the money.

In 2022, the subsidiary Poštovní spořitelna was renamed ČSOB Poštovní spořitelna and ČSOB allowed the customers to use their branch network as well as their services. In the same year, ČSOB acquired the remaining stake in the joint-venture Mallpay from Mall Group.

In 2023 ČSOB was ordered to pay 3.7 billion CZK in an abitral to the Icec-Holding, which the company had initiated in 2016. Icec-Holding had sued the Investiční a poštovní banku (IPB), whose legal issues ČSOB took over together with the bank later on, in 1999 claiming the IPB broke contractual obligations by taking over a Slovenian paper mill Icec held shares in.

In 2024, ČSOB bought a 30% stake in the startup Ownest, jointly controlling it with the European Housing Services estate group. In January 2026, ČSOB’s parent company KBC acquired a majority stake in 365.bank and plans to integrate it into ČSOB.

== ČSOB Group ==
ČSOB Group is one of the largest financial institutions in the Czech Republic. From 1 January 2013 KBC Group's core market activities have been arranged in three business units: Belgium, the Czech Republic and International Markets.

The structure of ČSOB Group
Subsidiary	Share of ČSOB, a.s.	Description
Hypoteční banka, a.s.	100 %	Mortgage bank
ČSOB Poštovní spořitelna, a.s.	100 %	Retail bank
ČSOB Stavební spořitelna, a.s	100 %	Building society
Patria Finance, a.s.	100 %	Prime broker
ČSOB Asset Management, a.s.	100 %	Investment banking
ČSOB Penzijní společnost, a.s.	100 %	Pension fund
ČSOB Pojišťovna, a.s.	0.24 %	Insurance company
ČSOB Leasing, a.s.	100 %	the largest leasing company in Czech Republic
ČSOB Factoring, a.s.	100 %	Factoring company
Burza cenných papierov v Bratislave, a.s.	11.77 %	Stock exchange
Top-Pojištění.cz s.r.o.	100 %	Broker of insurance companies
Ušetřeno.cz, s.r.o	100 %	

== Financial data ==
Financial data of ČSOB Group for period since 2010, billions Kč
Year	2010	2011	2012	2013	2014	2015	2016	2017	2018	2019	2020	2021	2022
Net profit	13.471	11.172	15.291	13.658	13.604	14.010	15.141	17.517	15.757	19.7	8.5	16.2	14.6
Total assets	885.055	936.593	937.174	962.954	865.639	956.325	1085.527	1315.590	1378.038	1631.067	1756.440	1805.479	1805.617
Clients, mln	3.078 (bank)	3.096 (bank)	3.054 (bank)	2.947 (bank)	2.855 (bank)	2.831 (bank)	3.672	3.668	3.635	4.24	4.23	4.22	4.34

== Headquarters ==
- Československá obchodní banka, a.s., Radlická 333/150, 150 57 Prague, Czech Republic
- Československá obchodná banka, a.s., Žižkova 11, 811 02 Bratislava, Slovakia

== See also ==
- List of banks in the Czech Republic
