= Piet Van Waeyenberge =

Belgian businessman (born 1938)

Piet Paul August, Baron Van Waeyenberge (born Ghent, Belgium, 27 October 1938) is a Belgian businessman. He is a son of Camille Van Waeyenberge and a brother of Jozef Van Waeyenberge. He was one of the founders, and is currently president, of business club De Warande. He is married to Wina Proesmans and together they have 3 children.

== Biography ==
He graduated in 1956 from high school at the Sint-Jan Berchmanscollege in Brussels and obtained a licentiate in Commercial and Financial Sciences at the Catholic University of Louvain in 1960. In 1962, he obtained a Master of Science in Agricultural Economics at the University of Illinois Champaign (Urbana, IL USA) and in 1963, a Master of Business Administration at INSEAD (Fontainebleau, France). In 1978, he attended the six-week Advanced Management Program at Harvard Business School (Cambridge, US.

During his professional career he held several positions in companies, such as chairman of De Eik n.v, De Warande vzw, Indufin s.a., and of Cultura Brussels. He was manager of BG & Co, director of Fortis s.a. and Fortis Brussels s.a., Suez Energy Services (independent director), Sobelder s.a., VUM Media/Corelio n.v., Janssen Pharmaceutica NV, and of Campina Melkunie NV.

He is honorary chairman of the Vlaams Economisch Verbond (VOKA), member of the Supervisory Board of Campina Melkunie n.v., of Koninklijke Sphinx Gustavsberg n.v. and of De Eik Beheer b.v. (Nijmegen). In 1988, he founded Asphales, later renamed as Fortales n.v. and was a director of Almanij (merged with KBC to form the KBC Group).

He is or has been chairman of cultural causes like Maison de la Radio Flagey s.a. and Flagey asbl, and board member of Quartier des Arts asbl, the International Queen Elisabeth Music Competition, of Europalia International vzw, the Vlaamse Academische Stichting vzw, and of the Francqui Foundation (Public Benefit Foundation).

He has been honored as a Commandeur in de Orde van Oranje-Nassau (Dutch) and Officier in de Leopoldsorde (Belgian).

== Private life ==
He is the father of three children, including Titia Van Waeyenberge, who succeeded him as chairman of De Eik in 2018.

Van Waeyenberge has lived in the renovated 17th-century Bailiff's House in Gaasbeek since 1973 and renovated the nearby old dairy into a library and cultural space. On his domain, at the foot of the Castle of Gaasbeek, he has a stud farm (breeding) of Brabant draft horses.

== Sources ==
- Piet Van Waeyenberge
- Piet Van Waeyenberge (Electrabel)
- Flagey brengt Piet Van Waeyenberge in Leopoldsorde
