= KBC Group =

Belgian bank

KBC Group N.V.

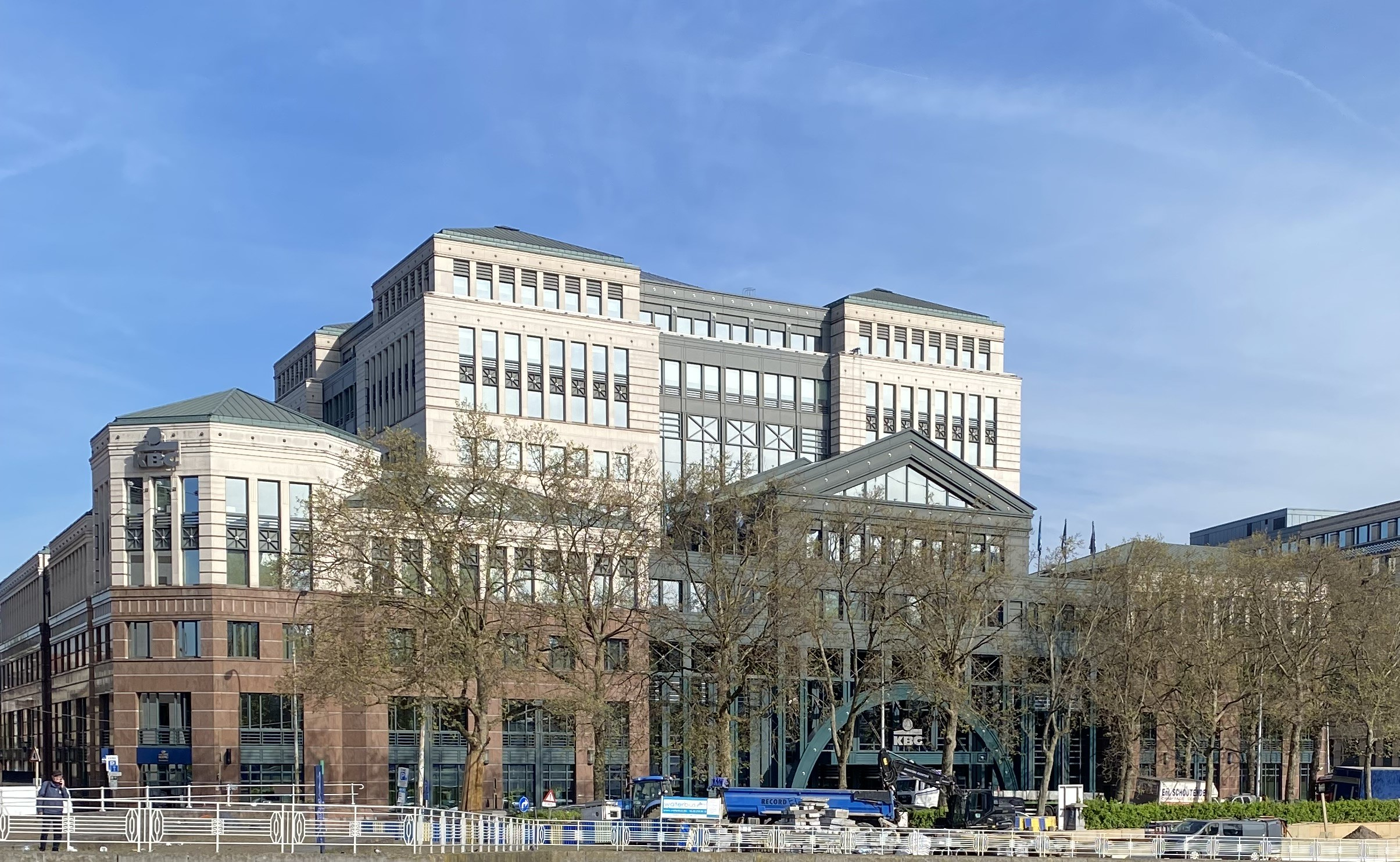
- KBC Group head office in Brussels
- Type: Public
- Traded as: Euronext Brussels: KBC; LuxSE: KBC; BEL 20 component
- ISIN: BE0003565737
- Industry: Financial services
- Founded: 9 February 1935; 91 years ago (Kredietbank), present name (KBC Group) dates from 2005
- Headquarters: Havenlaan 2, BE-1080 Brussels, Belgium
- Key people: Koenraad Debackere (Chairperson); Johan Thijs (CEO); Bartel Puelinckx (CFO)
- Products: Retail banking; corporate banking; investment banking; insurance; private banking; private equity; mortgage loans; credit cards; investment management; wealth management; asset management; mutual funds; exchange-traded funds; index funds
- Revenue: €7.629 billion (2019)
- Net income: €2.489 billion (2019)
- AUM: €216 billion (2019)
- Total assets: €412.249 (Q2 2026)
- Total equity: €20.4 billion (end 2019)
- Number of employees: 37,854 (FTE, end 2019)
- Website: www.kbc.com

KBC Group N.V. is a Belgian universal multi-channel bank-insurer, focusing on private clients and small and medium-sized enterprises in Belgium, Bulgaria, Czech Republic, Hungary, and Slovakia. It was created in 1998 through the merger of Kredietbank (KB), the cooperative CERA Bank, ABB Insurance, and Fidelitas Insurance.

KBC Group is one of Belgium's major companies and the second largest bancassurer in the country. As of late 2020, it was the 15th largest bank in Europe by market capitalisation and a major financial player in Central and Eastern Europe, employing some 41,000 staff (of which more than half in Central and Eastern Europe) and serving 12 million customers worldwide (some 7 to 8 million in Central and Eastern Europe). KBC is a Forbes Global 2000 company.

The group is controlled by a group of core shareholders, and has a free float of approximately 60%. The core shareholders include KBC Ancora, a listed company controlled by CERA (or Cera cvba, a holding company formed by the cooperative clients of CERA Bank at the time of the 1998 merger), owning 19%; MRBB (Maatschappij voor Roerend Bezit van de Boerenbond), a vehicle of the Boerenbond farmers' association, at 12%; a group of industrialist families, at 8%; and CERA directly, at 3%. Its shares are traded on the Euronext exchange in Brussels. KBC has been designated as a Significant Institution since the entry into force of European Banking Supervision in late 2014, and as a consequence is directly supervised by the European Central Bank.

== Background ==
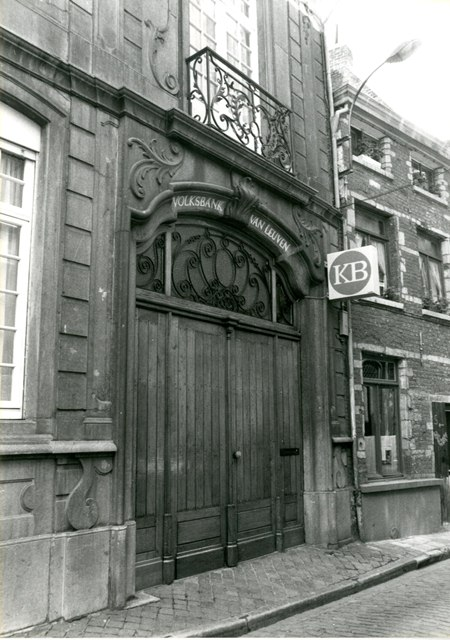
Hotel d'Eynatten, Leuven, in 1976, with the names of both Volksbank van Leuven and Kredietbank (KB)

=== Volksbank van Leuven, local savings banks and Middenkredietkas ===
On 17 July 1889, a group of prominent Catholics founded the Volksbank van Leuven ("People's Bank of Leuven"), a cooperative bank to finance the development of business in and around Leuven.

In the early 1890s, the Boerenbond farmers movement, similarly inspired by Catholicism and corporatism and also based in Leuven, led the development of burgeoning network of rural cooperative banks inspired by the model created in Germany by Friedrich Wilhelm Raiffeisen. The first of these Spaaren Leengilden ("savings and loans associations") was created in 1892 in the village of Rillaar near Aarschot. By 1895, there were 24 Spaaren Leengilden; that year, the Boerenbond established the Middenkredietkas ("central credit fund") as a central body to help them manage their customers' savings and access funding from the Caisse générale d'épargne et de retraite, a national financial institution. In 1902, the network had grown to 190 local savings banks, and would further expand to 378 by 1913 and 1099 in 1934. In 1903, the Middenkredietkas decided to reduce its exclusive dependence on the CGER and established a permanent relationship with the Volksbank van Leuven for the management of some of the farmers' savings.

=== Algemene Bankvereeniging, Bank voor Handel en Nijverheid, Almanij ===
After World War I, the Middenkredietkas strengthened its structural cooperation with the Volksbank van Leuven, which in 1919 had transformed itself into a joint-stock company. The two institutions jointly sponsored the creation or acquired control of several other banks in Dutch-speaking Belgium, including the Algemeene Bankvereeniging (ABV, "General Banking Association"), founded in 1921 in Antwerp, and two banks named Bank voor Handel en Nijverheid (BHN, "Bank for Trade and Industry") respectively in Ghent and Kortrijk. On 1 October 1928, ABV and the Volksbank van Leuven merged. The new entity, which kept the name Algemeene Bankvereeniging, was controlled by the Middenkredietkas; in 1930 it acquired BHN Ghent, which in the meantime had merged with a number of other local banks in East Flanders, and in October 1931 purchased another financial group, the Crédit Général de Belgique also known as Crédital. The latter combination resulted in the creation in 1931 of the holding company Almanij in Antwerp, which received a number of industrial company stakes. As a consequence, the Boerenbond-controlled banking cluster became one of Belgium's largest credit institutions, able to rival the Banque de Bruxelles and Generale Bank. The Boerentoren high-rise building in Antwerp, financed by ABV, was the second-tallest skyscraper in Europe at the time of its completion in 1931, just behind Madrid's Telefónica Building (1929). It became the symbol of the Boerengroup's financial might, to the dismay of some of the Catholic clergy including Cardinal Jozef-Ernest van Roey who feared that the farmers' movement was drifting away from its religious roots and towards commercialism.

=== Kredietbank ===
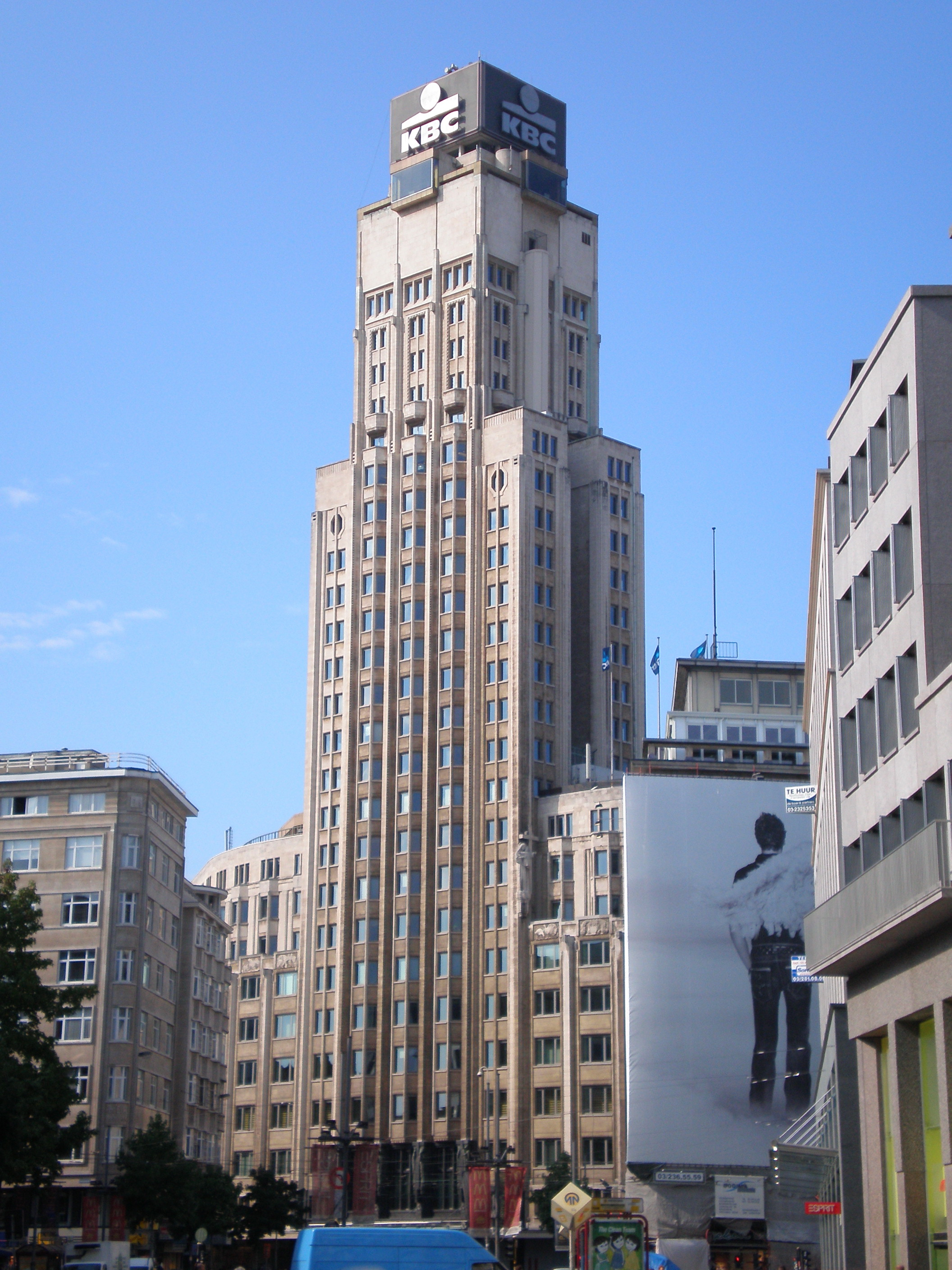
Boerentoren in Antwerp (1931)

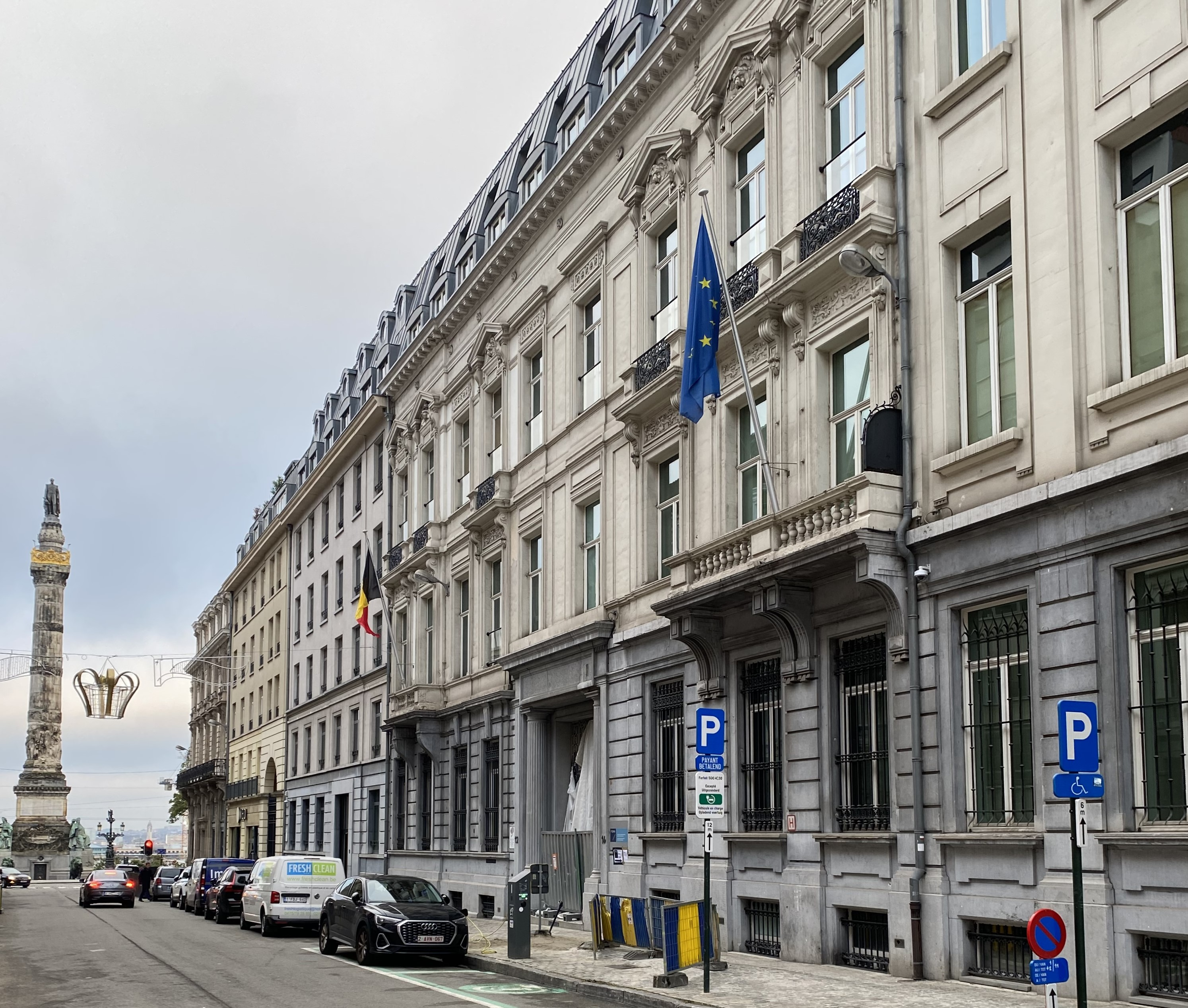
Building at rue du Congrès 14 in Brussels, former Belgian head office of Kredietbank-Congo

With financial stress increasing in the early 1930s, however, the Middenkredietkas accumulated losses and had to declare a moratorium on its liabilities on 3 December 1934, followed on 8 March 1935 by a highly publicized liquidation process. The restructuring, including a reimbursement of depositors that would only be completed in 1963, was directly managed by the Belgian government and led by Albert-Édouard Janssen. On 9 February 1935, ABV and BHN Kortrijk merged to form the Kredietbank voor Handel en Nijverheid, commonly known as Kredietbank (KB). The Kredietbank was registered in Antwerp but its actual head office was established in Brussels. Fernand Collin, who became its president in 1938, defined the Kredietbank as an independent bank with a decidedly Flemish character which would be an instrument to further Flemish economic growth.

In 1943, Almanij, which had become Kredietbank's majority owner during the 1935 restructuring, underwent a capital increase. As a consequence, the Middenkredietkas (in liquidation) became a minority shareholder, and the control of the group was transferred to a group of families later known as the "Almanij Syndicate", which by the 1970s included Collin and André Vlerick, a son-in-law of Gustave Sap who had been associated with the Algemeene Bankvereeniging since its creation.

In 1949, Kredietbank established its first international subsidiary, Kredietbank SA Luxembourg (known as KBL). In 1951, Kredietbank's shares began listing on the Brussels Stock Exchange, even though Almanij retained control. In 1952, Kredietbank expanded into the Belgian Congo by establishing a branch in Léopoldville, then in 1954 acquired Banque Congolaise pour l’Industrie, le Commerce et l’Agriculture and renamed it Kredietbank-Congo. That operation grew into four branches, in Léopoldville (now Kinshasa), Bukavu, Elizabethville (now Lubumbashi), and Stanleyville (now Kisangani), but was discontinued in 1966 following Belgian Congolese independence in 1960. In 1958, Kredietbank expanded into Wallonia through the acquisition of local banks, which it merged in 1961 into a newly formed subsidiary named Crédit Général. Kredietbank further built up its international network in the late 1960s, with the opening of offices in New York and Mexico City, then in Johannesburg, Melbourne, Atlanta, Tehran, Tokyo, Madrid, and Los Angeles, and branches in New York, London, the Cayman Islands, and a subsidiary in Geneva. In 1970, together with six other European institutions, Kredietbank established the Inter-Alpha Group of Banks.

In 1979, controlling ownership of KBL was transferred from Kredietbank directly to Almanij. In 1982, Kredietbank acquired majority ownership of Bankverein Bremen AG, originally founded in 1889 as Bremer Vorschussverein, and renamed it Kredietbank-Bankverein AG in 1990, also known as Bremer Kreditbank or BKB. In 1996, KBL absorbed Banque continentale du Luxembourg. In 1997, Kredietbank expanded into Hungary through the privatization of K&H Bank.

=== ABB and CERA ===
During the Middenkredietkas's liquidation in March 1935, the Boerenbond renamed its rural cooperatives as Raiffeisenkassen, and formed a new central body in Leuven, the Centrale Kas voor Landbouwkrediet (CKL, "Central fund for agricultural credit"). In 1941, its insurance operations developed since the late 19th century were renamed Assurantie van de Belgische Boerenbond (ABB, "Belgian Farmers' Union Insurance") and in the following decades became one of the largest Belgian insurers.

The number of Belgian Raiffeisen banks was about 800 in the early 1970s, then further decreased through consolidation to reach 218 in 1996. In 1970, the CKL changed its name to Centrale Raiffeisenkas ("Central Raiffeisen Fund"), which in the late 1970s was abbreviated to CERA; it moved from downtown Leuven to an expansive new office campus in the city's outskirts in 1991. In the mid-1980s, a new legal framework led to the creation in 1986 of CERA Bank as a fully-fledged central banking entity.

== 1998 Merger and subsequent history ==
On 3 June 1998, CERA Bank, ABB, and Fidelitas (the insurance arm of Almanij) merged into Kredietbank NV, whose name was changed to KB ABB Cera Bank and Insurance Holding Company NV. On 27 April 2000, the group's parent entity was renamed KBC Bank and Insurance Holding Company NV. On 2 March 2005, that was shortened to KBC Group NV simultaneously with merger with Almanij, the former holding company.

In 1999, KBC acquired majority control of Československá obchodní banka, a prominent bank in the Czech Republic and Slovakia. In 2001-2002 it took control of Kredyt Bank in Poland. By 2007, it had made further acquisitions in Bulgaria (DZI Insurance, DZI Invest and EIBANK), Romania (KBC Securities Romania, Romstal Leasing and INK Insurance Broker), Russia (Absolut Bank), and Serbia (KBC Banka and Senzal, Hipobroker, and Bastion). In 2008, it purchased Istrobanka in Slovakia from BAWAG.

The stock price dropped from €106 on 18 May 2007 to €5 on 6 March 2009, a loss of 95% over a period of 22 months, during the Great Recession. The bank needed and received support from the Flemish government for an amount of 3.5 billion Euros. After the crisis the bank embarked on a divestment programme to satisfy the requirements of the European Commission. As such, it sold several subsidiaries, including Centea, Fidea, Kredyt Bank, ADB, KBC Deutschland, Absolut Bank and KBL European Private Bankers, the latter being acquired by Precision Capital, owned by Hamad bin Jassim bin Jaber Al Thani, for a reported €1.05 billion in October 2011 and renamed Quintet Private Bank in 2020. The divestment programme was completed in 2014 and the state aid entirely paid back by 2015, five years ahead of the agreed schedule. Since then the KBC share price recovered to around a maximum of €75 in the month of January 2022.

In 2017, KBC acquired United Bulgarian Bank (UBB) and Interlease in Bulgaria. On 7 July 2022 KBC Bank acquired Raiffeisenbank (Bulgaria) EAD from Raiffeisen Bank International and rebranded it KBC Bank Bulgaria. On 10 April 2023 KBC Bank Bulgaria has been merged into United Bulgarian Bank. In February 2017, Ireland was defined as a new core market of KBC Group, but in April 2021, KBC entered into talks with Bank of Ireland to sell its performing loan book and announced its intention to withdraw from Ireland. In April 2024, KBC Bank Ireland returned its banking licence to the Central Bank of Ireland on 30 April, formalising KBC Group exit from the Irish market.

As of 2026, the KBC group is focused on five countries: Belgium, Bulgaria, Czech Republic, Hungary, and Slovakia.

On 15 May 2025, KBC announced the acquisition of 365.bank from J&T Finance Group SE for 761 million euros, which was completed in January 2026. In November 2026, KBC merged 365.bank into its Slovak unit ČSOB, thus expanding its footprint in Slovakia up to 1.4 million clients and a market share of around 20%.

In August 2025, KBC reported a strong quarterly performance, with net interest income rising 9% year-over-year to €1.51 billion and net profit reaching €1.02 billion.

== Structure and main subsidiaries ==
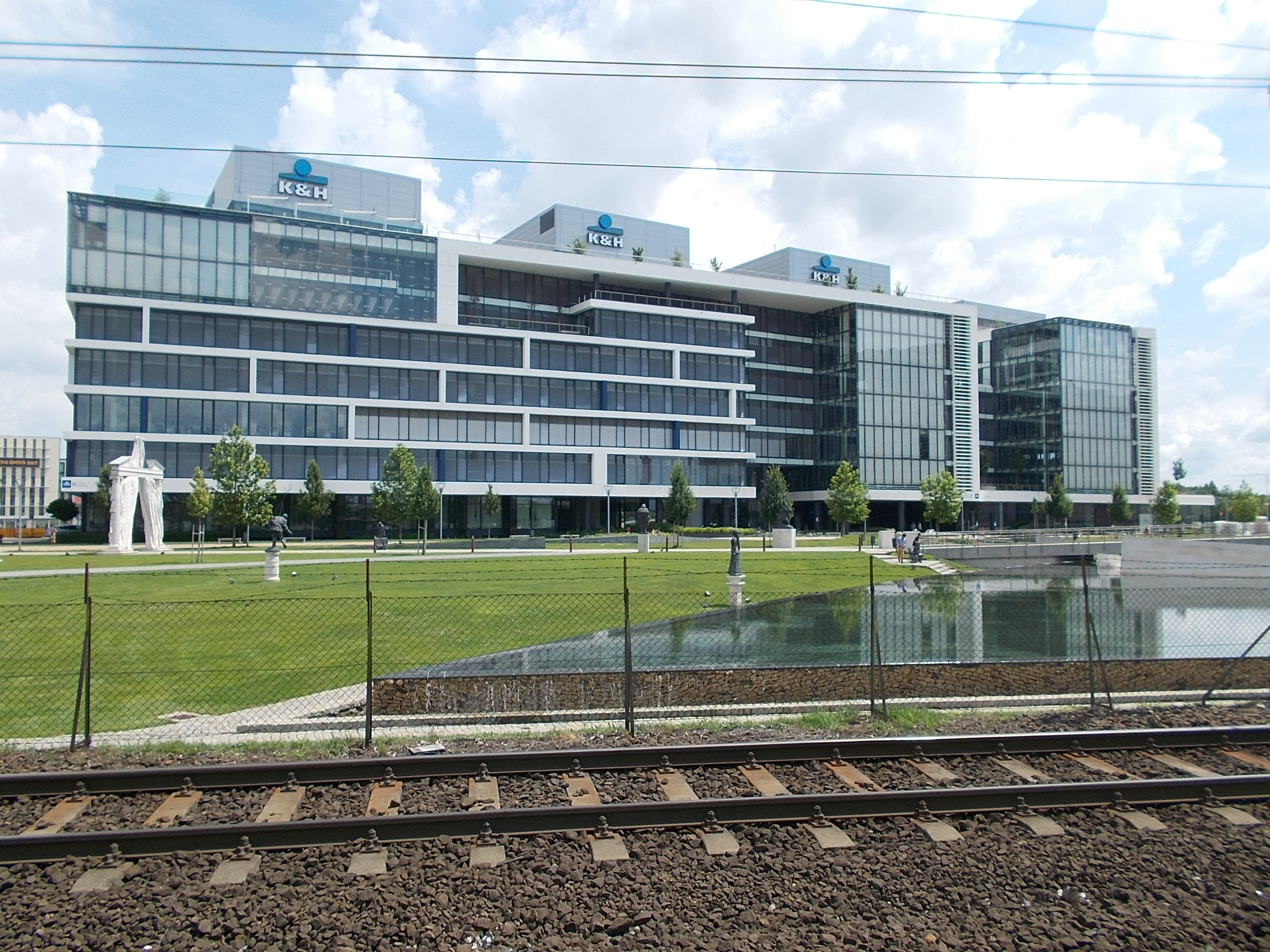
Headquarters of K&H Bank, Budapest

KBC Group NV is the direct parent company of:

- KBC Bank NV
- KBC Insurance NV
- KBC Global Services NV : provides services to KBC Group NV's activities
- Discai NV

All other KBC Group companies are direct or indirect subsidiaries of these. The main ones are shown in the table:

Company	Registered office	Share of capital held at group level (in%)	Business unit*	Activity
KBC BANK GROUP				
KBC Bank NV	Brussels – BE	100,00	BEL	credit institution
CBC BANQUE SA	Namur – BE	100,00	BEL	credit institution
Československá Obchodná Banka a.s.	Bratislava – SK	100,00	IMA	credit institution
Československá Obchodní Banka a.s.	Prague – CZ	100,00	CZR	credit institution
CIBANK EAD	Sofia – BG	100,00	IMA	credit institution
KBC Asset Management NV	Brussels – BE	100,00	BEL	asset management
KBC Autolease NV	Leuven – BE	100,00	BEL	leasing
KBC Commercial Finance NV	Brussels – BE	100,00	BEL	factoring
KBC Credit Investments NV	Brussels – BE	100,00	BEL/GRP	investment firm
KBC IFIMA SA	Luxembourg – LU	100,00	GRP	financing
KBC Securities NV	Brussels – BE	100,00	BEL	stockbroker
K&H Bank Zrt.	Budapest – HU	100,00	IMA	credit institution
Loan Invest NV	Brussels – BE	100,00	IMA	securitisation
United Bulgarian Bank AD	Sofia – BG	99,91	IMA	credit institution
KBC INSURANCE (GROUP)				
KBC Insurance NV	Leuven – BE	100,00	BEL/GRP	insurance company
ADD NV	Heverlee – BE	100,00	BEL	insurance broker
KBC Group Re SA	Luxembourg – LU	100,00	GRP	reinsurance company
ČSOB Pojišťovna a.s.	Pardubice – CZ	100,00	CZR	insurance company
ČSOB Poisťovňa a.s.	Bratislava – SK	100,00	IMA	insurance company
DZI (group)	Sofia – BG	100,00	IMA	insurance company
Groep VAB NV	Zwijndrecht – BE	95,00	BEL	driving school/roadside assistance
K&H Biztosító Zrt.	Budapest – HU	100,00	IMA	insurance company
KBC GROUP				
KBC Group NV	Brussels – BE	100,00	GRP	bank-insurance holding company
KBC Bank (group)	various locations	100,00	various	credit institution
KBC Insurance (group)	various locations	100,00	various	insurance company
KBC Global Services	Brussels - BE	100,00	GRP	cost-sharing structure
Discai NV	Brussels - BE	100,00	GRP	software company

BEL = Belgium Business Unit, CZR = Czech Republic Business Unit, IMA = International Markets Business Unit, GRP = Group Centre.

=== KBC Bank NV ===
KBC Bank is the main subsidiary. Its first home market is Belgium, where it is one of the top three banks, with a 20-25% market share and over three million customers (counting the customers of the subsidiaries in Belgium).

Its second home market is Central Europe, served via subsidiaries and investments in the Czech Republic (ČSOB), Slovakia (ČSOB and 365.bank), Hungary (K&H Bank) and Bulgaria (UBB Bank). In all of these countries, KBC Bank is a leading player by market share.

It also had a substantial presence in Ireland through its subsidiary KBC Bank Ireland (formerly IIB Bank). The sale of substantially all assets of KBC Bank Ireland to Bank of Ireland was completed on 2 February 2023. In all, KBC Bank has established a presence in some thirty countries.

KBC Project Finance is a subsidiary of KBC Bank, and has been an active player in the non-recourse financing of projects since the early 1990s. Headquartered in Dublin, it also has professionals based in London, Brussels, New York, Hong Kong, and Sydney. Its main business lines are Energy and Infrastructure. This includes financing projects in sectors such as the oil & gas industry, power, renewable energy, and Public-Private Partnership. It has a portfolio in excess of US$5bn, financing approximately 250 projects worldwide.

== Notable buildings associated with KBC ==
=== Leuven ===
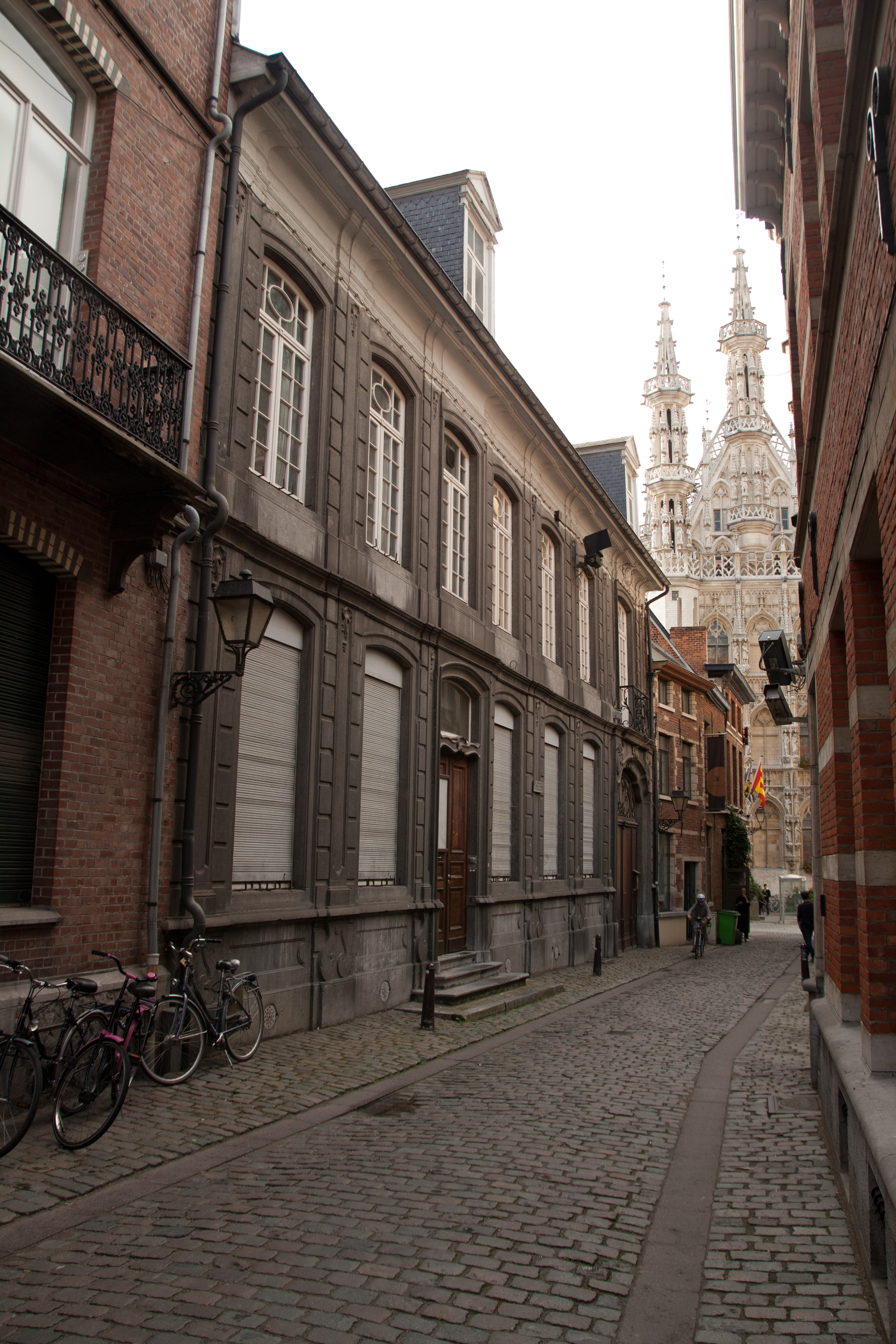
Hotel d'Eynatten in Leuven, since 1925 part of the Volksbank van Leuven headquarters complex

- The ornate former building of Volksbank van Leuven on Muntstraat, now named after Boerenbond co-founder Joris Helleputte, was erected in 1912–1913 on a design by architects Frans Jr. Vermeylen and Joseph François Piscador. In 1925, the bank annexed the former Hotel d'Eynatten on nearby Eikstraat to be the residence of the bank's director. The complex, later enlarged at the corner of Boekhandelstraat, was purchased by CERA in 2007 from the City of Leuven as its headquarters, for which it erected an award-winning new corner building completed in 2018.
- The former office park of CERA outside Leuven, designed by Jaspers-Eyers Architects and inaugurated in 1991, is now offices of KBC Group.

=== Antwerp ===
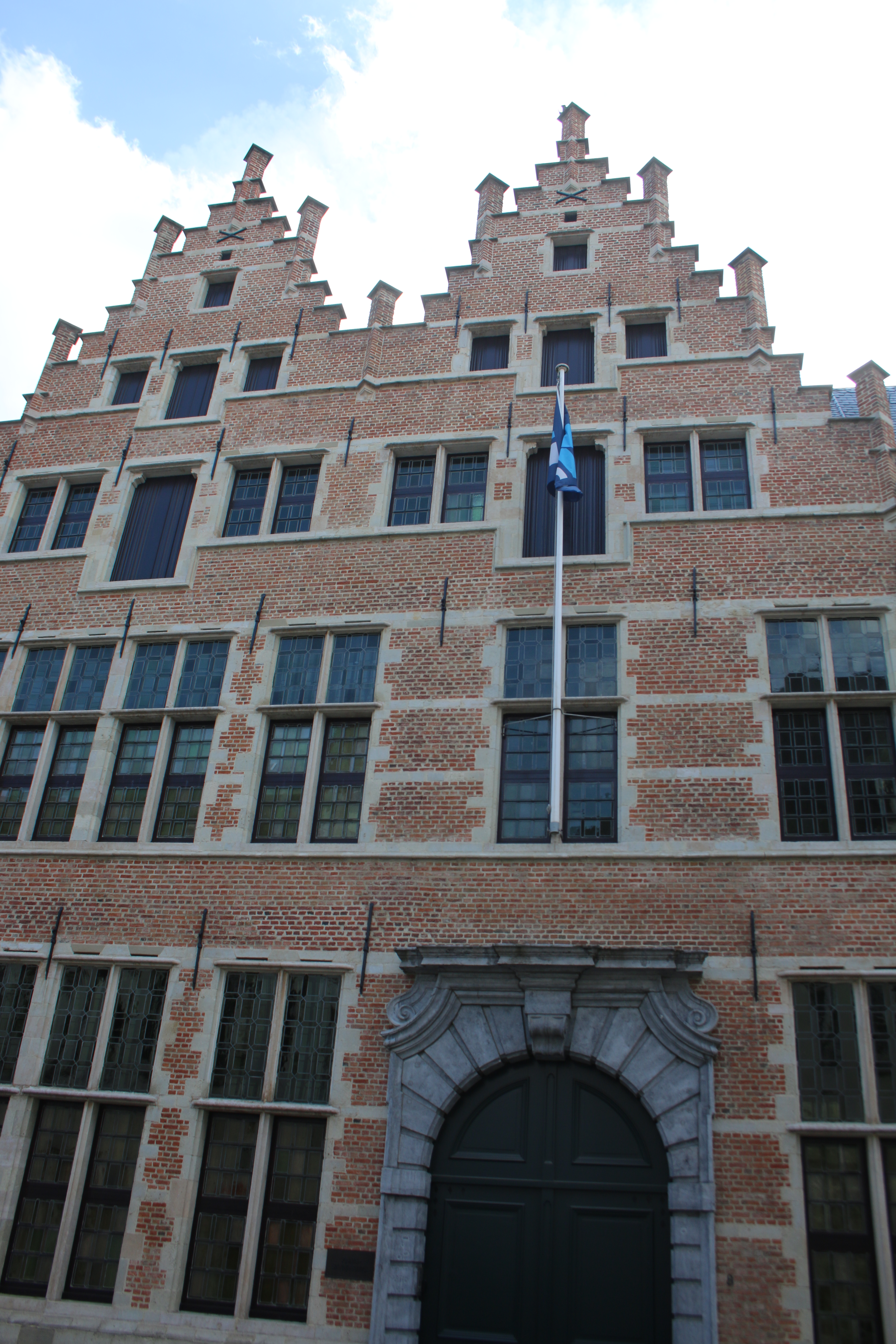
Snyderhuis in Antwerp, former seat of Almanij

- The former head office of Algemeene Bankvereeniging in Antwerp was a 19th-century mansion reconverted as bank headquarters in 1921–1922 on a design by architect Max Winders. It was demolished in 1980 to make space for the extension of the Instituut Dames van het Christelijk Onderwijs, a Catholic school.
- The Boerentoren or "KBC Tower" in Antwerp was erected by Algemeene Bankvereeniging in 1931, initially mostly as a residential building. It was transformed into offices in the late 1960s and used by Kredietbank, then KBC from the 1970s to the 2010s.
- The former seat of Almanij in Antwerp, in the historic Snyderhuis (or Snijdershuis) adjacent to Rockox House on Keizerstraat, is now offices of KBC's Private Banking division.

=== Kortrijk ===
- The art deco former seat of Bank voor Handel en Nijverheid on Leiestraat 21 in Kortrijk has been repurposed as an annex of Kortrijk City Hall.

=== Ghent ===
- At 118,5 meters it is the highest office in the Flemish Region. In the new building, KBC centralises its services previously scattered around Ghent: Kouterdreef, Kortrijksesteenweg, Bellevue, Zuiderpoort and the education center of Merelbeke.

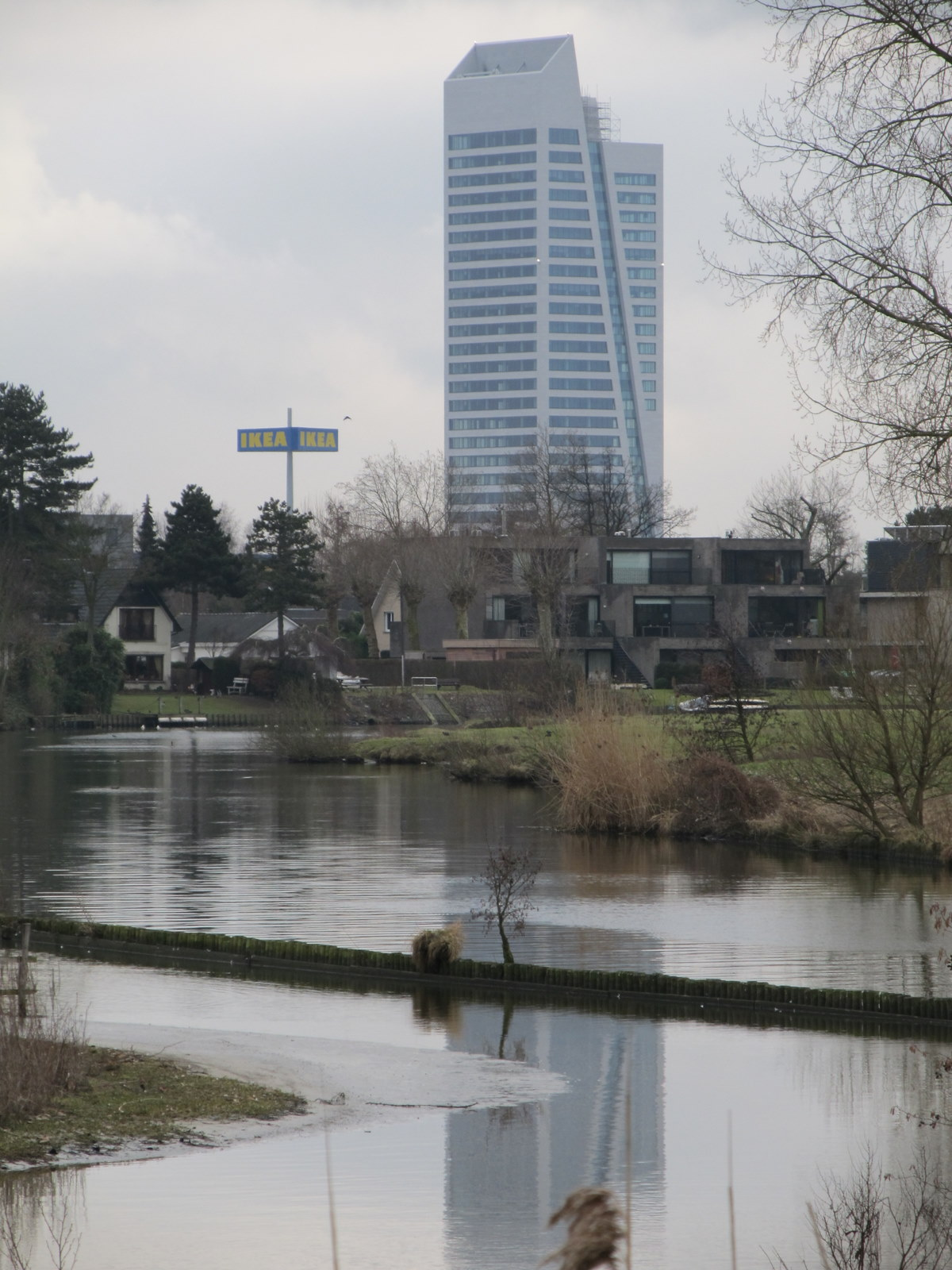
Artevelde Tower in Ghent

=== Brussels ===
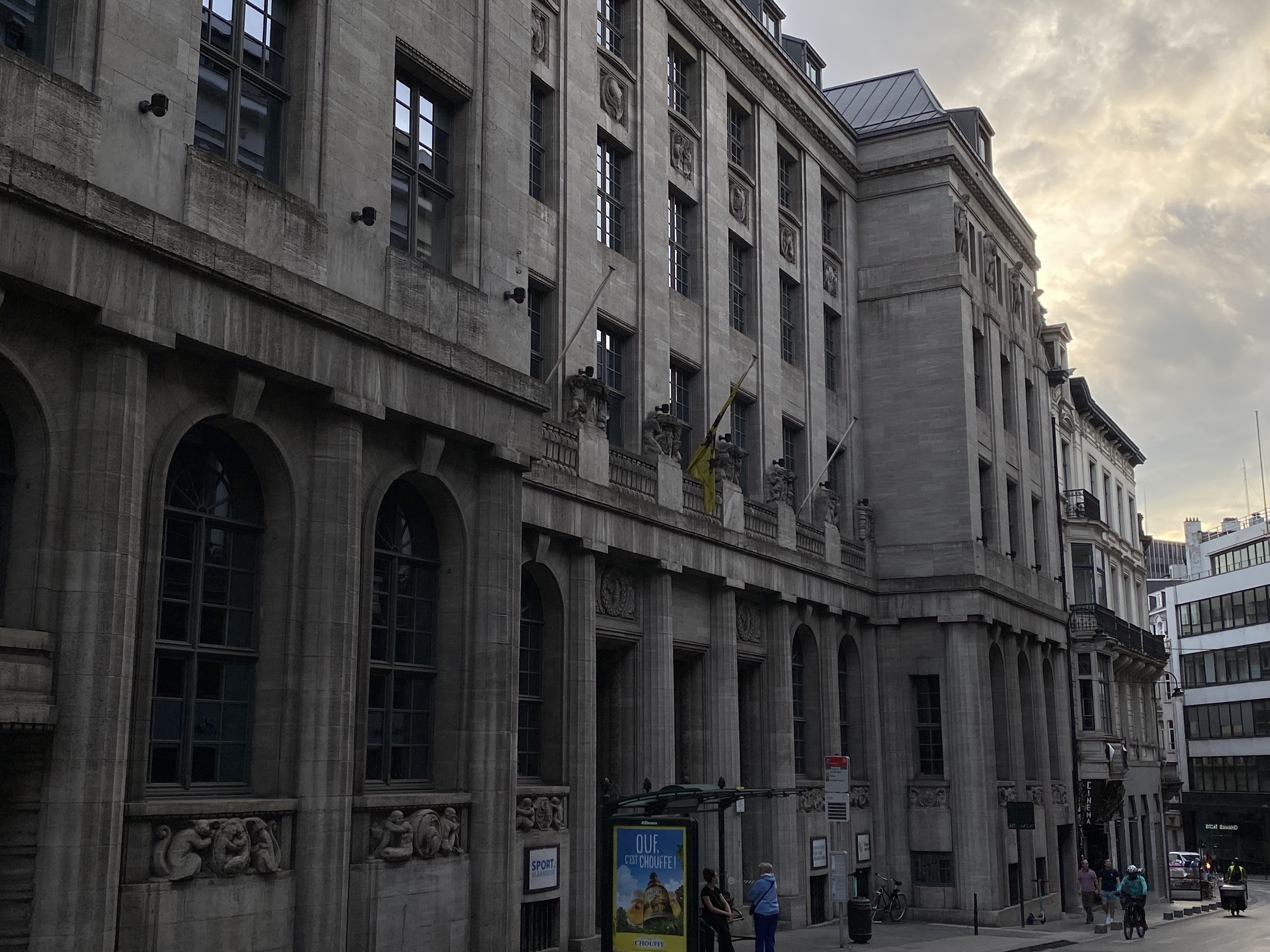
Former Brussels head office of Kredietbank, then KBC on rue d'Arenberg, 7

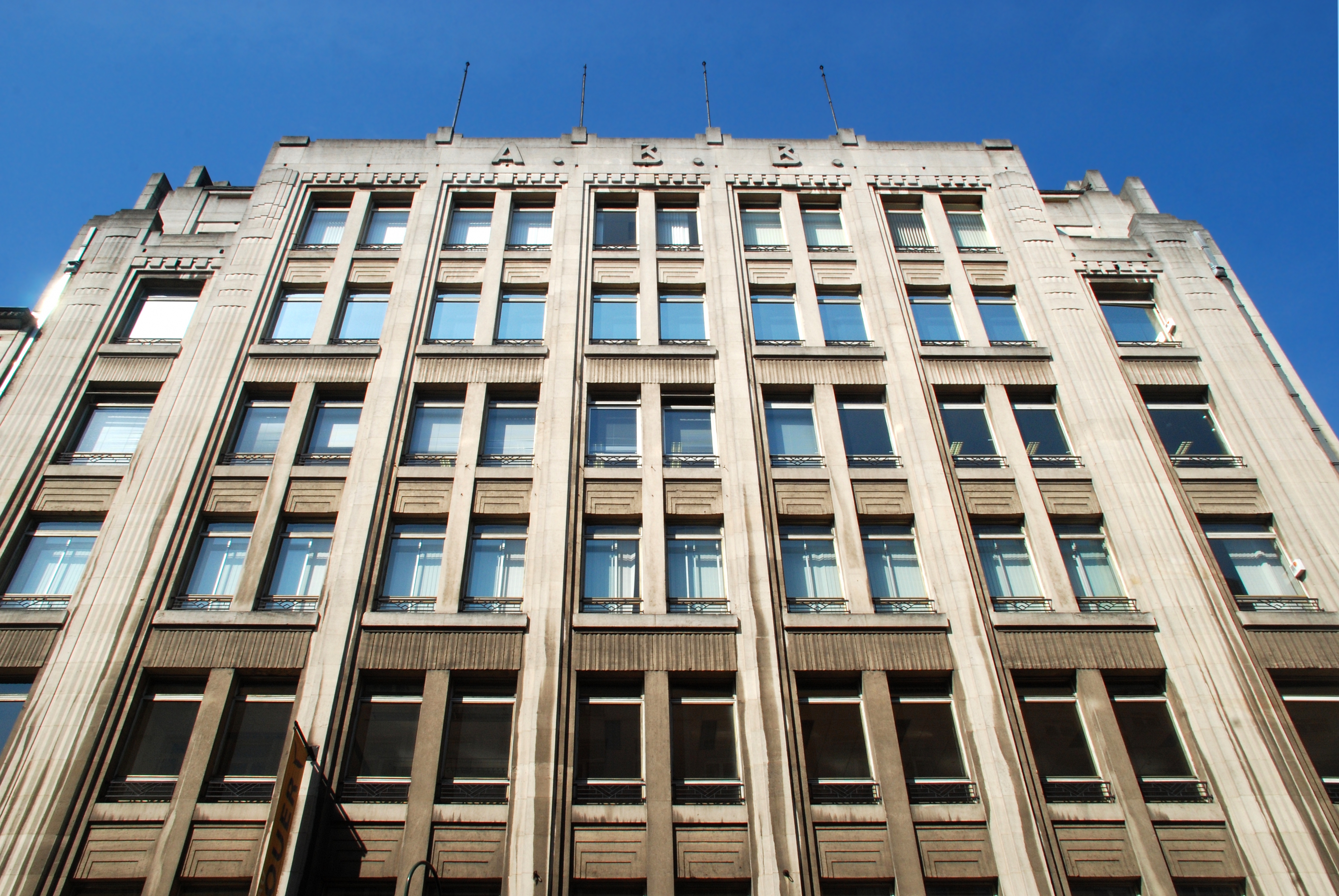
Former ABB building in Brussels, rue des Poissoniers 13

- The former Brussels head office of Kredietbank, then KBC on rue d'Arenberg, 7, was originally built in 1912 by Deutsche Bank on a design by Hans Jessen, with sculpture by Georges Vandevoorde, on the location of the former offices of the Balser private bank which Deutsche had purchased two years earlier. It was acquired by Volksbank van Leuven from the Belgian state in 1928, following the post-WWI termination of Deutsche Bank's activity in Belgium, and revamped for ABV by architect Alexis Dumont in 1929–1932. KBC left it in stages in the 1990s, and it is now an office complex of the Flemish Government known as Arenberggebouw.
- The art deco former building of the Assurantie van de Belgische Boerenbond on Rue des Poissoniers / Visverkopersstraat 13 in Brussels, designed by architect Henri Wildenblanck and completed in 1931
- The current head office of KBC Group and KBC Bank on Havenlaan 2 in Brussels, was erected in the 1990s to consolidate teams that had been scattered in numerous locations in the city.

== Art collection ==
The private art collection of KBC is situated in the Rockox House in Antwerp.

== Awards ==
In 2019, Harvard Business Review ranked KBC's CEO Johan Thijs as the 8th best performing CEO in the world.

== Controversy ==
=== Support for apartheid in South Africa ===
One of Kredietbank's main shareholders in the postwar period, André Vlerick, was actively involved in public advocacy of the Apartheid-promoting regime of South Africa and support of its circumvention of sanctions.

In April 2018, NGO OpenSecrets, in partnership with the Centre for Applied Legal Studies (CALS) at the Georgetown University Law Center, filed a complaint at the OECD, claiming that KBC and KBL had violated the Organization's Guidelines for Multinational Enterprises in their dealings with South Africa between 1977 and 1994. According to the complaint, KBC and KBL together "were responsible for facilitating up to 70% of all illegal arms transactions that allowed the apartheid government to secretly buy weapons despite mandatory UN arms sanctions." As part of that process, OpenSecrets and CALS submitted a detailed document to the OECD contact points in Belgium and Luxembourg to support their claim. At the same time, hearings were held on the matter at South Africa's People's Tribunal on Economic Crime led by Zak Yacoob in Johannesburg.

=== Terms of the 1998 merger ===
In December 1999, the Brussels commercial court ordered CERA Holding to pay an additional 2.48 billion euros to its cooperative shareholders, based on the finding that their contribution had been undervalued in the 1998 merger.

=== Investment in coal ===
KBC has been criticised for its investment policies regarding fossil fuels. According to a 2015 report by Belgian NGO Fairfin KBC invested US$2.4 billion between 2004 and 2014 through loans and emitting shares and obligations. In contrast the money allocated to renewable energy was only US$929 million.

When KBC reviewed its sustainability policy in 2016, the Global Network of Non-governmental organisation cooperating in the field of private banks and sustainability, Banktrack published an analysis acknowledging progress made on fossil fuels, while criticising the exception for the Czech Republic where the bank continues to finance coal, saying "the new general restriction on coal is welcome and positive, however the exception applied to Czech coal companies is concerning."

In 2017 the Belgian Climate Coalition published a report charting the investments in fossil fuel of the four major banks in Belgium (KBC, ING, BNP Paribas and Belfius). In this report they attacked the exception for the Czech Republic as well, saying “the exceptions for coal activities in the Czech Republic don’t comply with the strict deadlines imposed by climate science.”

== See also ==
- Fernand Collin
- Luc Debaillie
- Frank Donck
- Gustave Sap
- Jozef Van Waeyenberge
- Remi Vermeiren
- Philippe Vlerick
- List of European cooperative banks
- List of banks in the euro area
- List of banks in Belgium
