= Česká pošta =

Czech state postal enterprise

Czech Post
- Trade name: Česká pošta, s.p.
- Type: State-owned enterprise
- Industry: Postal services, courier
- Founded: 1918 (as Československá pošta); 1993 (in current form)
- Headquarters: Prague, Czech Republic
- Area served: Worldwide
- Key people: Richard Hodul (Chief Executive Officer)
- Services: Letter post, parcel service, EMS, delivery, freight forwarding, third-party logistics
- Revenue: 16,634,000,000 Czech koruna (2023)
- Operating income: −7,870,000,000 Czech koruna (2023)
- Net income: −747,000,000 Czech koruna (2023)
- Total assets: 16,137,000,000 Czech koruna (2023)
- Owner: Czech Republic
- Number of employees: 31,000 (2016); 23,500 (2022)
- Website: www.ceskaposta.cz

Czech Post (Czech: Česká pošta) is the state-owned postal company of the Czech Republic. With its headquarters in Prague, the corporation employs around 23,500 employees (as of 2022).

== History ==
=== History of the Czechoslovak Post ===
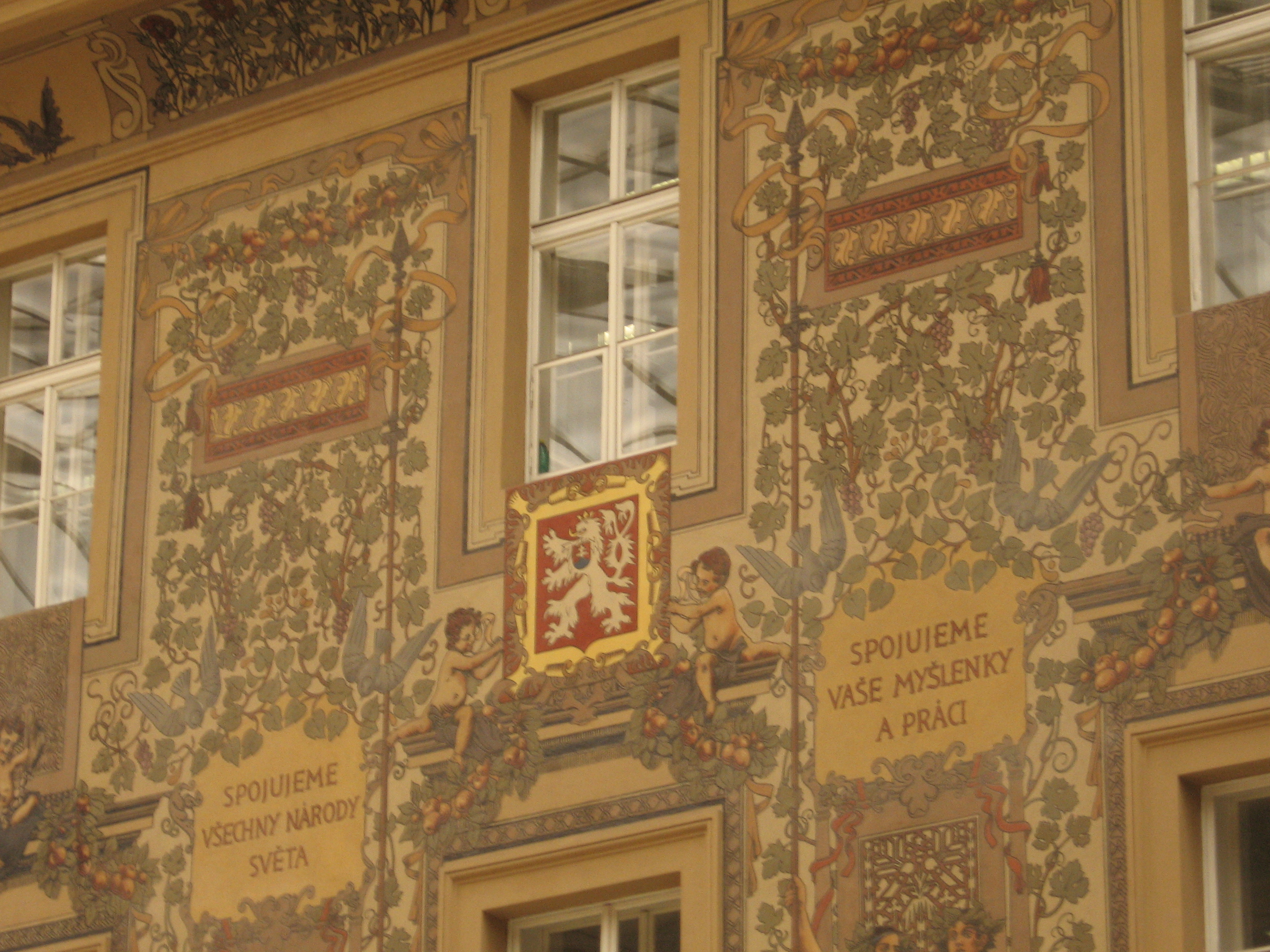
Interior of the main post office in Prague, Jindřišská street.

The Czechoslovak Post was established on 13 November 1918, with the establishment of the Ministry of Posts and Telegraphs, which was responsible for postal, telegraph, telephone and radio communication operations.

On 15 March 1939, after the occupation of the republic, the post office was subordinated to German interests. Postal affairs remained on the agenda of the Protectorate Ministry of Transport until November 1942, when they came under the newly established Ministry of Transport and Technology.

On 1 July 1949, the state enterprise Czechoslovak Post was nationalised and the Ministry of Posts was subsequently reorganised.

On 1 May 1952, the Central Committee of the Communist Party of Czechoslovakia abolished the national enterprise Czechoslovak Post. The existing business entity became a state agency managed according to the Soviet model.

In 1963, the Department of Communications was made independent under the Central Communications Administration, which was replaced by the Federal Committee for Posts and Telecommunications on 1 January 1969. At the republican level, the Ministry of Posts and Telecommunications of the Czechoslovak Socialist Republic in Prague and the Ministry of Transport, Posts and Telecommunications of the Slovak SSR in Bratislava were established.

=== History of the Czech Post ===
Česká pošta was established on 1 January 1993, on the Dissolution of Czechoslovakia, separated from the Slovak postal service, as well as from Cesky Telecom. All these organisations had previously been united under the Administration of Posts and Telecommunications, but were split following a decision from the Minister of Economy on 16 December.

In 1993, implementation of the APOST automatic postal system began.

On 29 May 1999, the postal service moved from the "outpatient method" of sorting items, whereby they were processed during the trip, to a system in which all mail was sorted in the collection transport hubs (Czech: Sběrných přepravních uzlů; SPUs) or at post offices. On 1 April 2005 Česká pošta became the responsibility of the Czech Telecommunication Office. On 1 September, that year the service received a certificate of accreditation for the provision of digital signatures.

On 1 September 2006, at the request of the Czech Telecommunications Office, 593 Post was renamed so that mail contains the name consistently modified the name of municipality (without specifying the attributes), except in the villages with the name composed of names of the two villages where the name of the mail, include only the name of one of the parts. On 1 October 2006, a decision of the Director General of Česká pošta canceled the operation of the branch plant, OZ shipping and commercial services and OZ VAKUS (acronym from the original name of Computer and control switchboard connections).

On 22 November 2006, the Supervisory Board discussed a proposal to convert Česká pošta into a limited company, and instructed the Director-General Karl Kratina to develop the proposal further.

A new SPU was opened in Brno in May 2007, replacing three former centres in Brno, Břeclav and Jihlava. Later in 2007 the government approved a plan to transform Česká pošta into a joint stock company, effective mid-2009. In March 2012, legislation was passed to remove the last monopoly from the service, exclusive delivery of items under 50 grams. This legislation came into effect in January 2013. Martin Elkán became the new CEO of Česká pošta in June 2014. In July 2014, Elkán announced a plan to franchise approximately 200 smaller post offices within the Czech Republic, with 49 franchises already in operation.

On 18 June 2018, Roman Knapp became CEO of Česká pošta. As of 1 March 2023, Miroslav Štěpán has been entrusted with the management of Česká pošta, replacing the dismissed CEO Roman Knap.

== Headquarters and structure ==
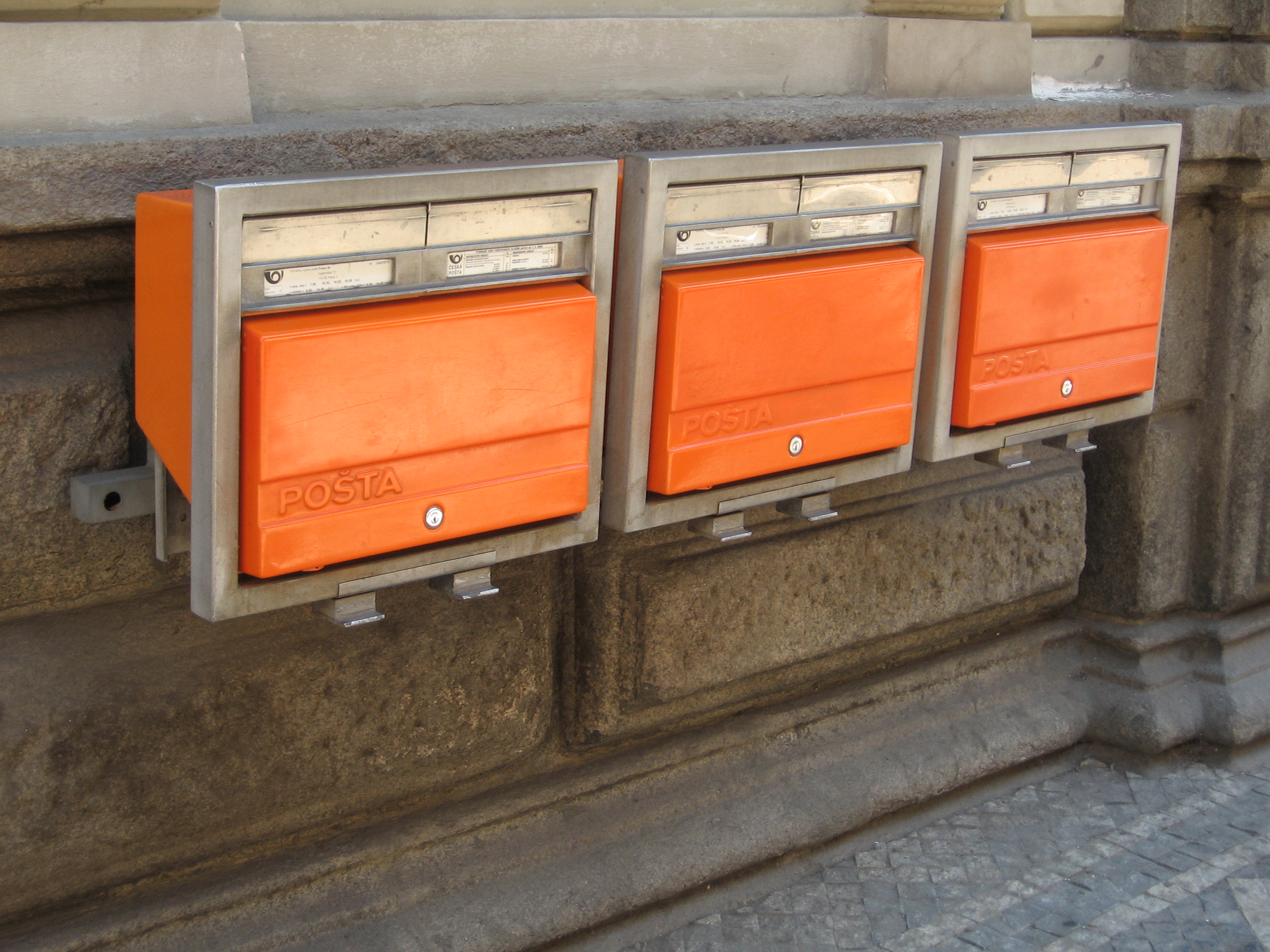
Mailboxes on the building of the main Prague post office.

Česká pošta, s.p. is managed by the General Directorate, headed by the CEO.

- The Director General - as the statutory body of Česká pošta, s.p., manages its activities and acts on its behalf. He or she decides on all matters of Česká pošta, s.p., unless they are reserved by law to the competence of the founder (pursuant to Section 12 of the Act on State Enterprise and the founding charter of Česká pošta, s.p.).
- The Supervisory Board - has twelve members and supervises the activities of the CEO and the implementation of the business plans of Česká pošta, s.p. In accordance with Act No. 77/1997 Coll., on the State Enterprise, as amended, eight members of the Supervisory Board are appointed and dismissed by the founder and four members are elected and dismissed by the employees of the enterprise. As of 31 December 2014, the Supervisory Board had twelve members.
- Committees of the Supervisory Board - The Supervisory Board establishes committees of the Supervisory Board as its working bodies. The meetings of the committees serve mainly for preliminary and more detailed discussion of materials that are subsequently dealt with by the Supervisory Board. The members of the committees are elected and dismissed by the Supervisory Board.
- The Directorate General has three divisions and eight separate Sections.16 The Directorate General is responsible for seven Regions (formerly Spin-off Plants) and nine Collector Transport Units (CTUs):

Under the scope of the Directorate-General there are currently seven branches and 9 SPUs:

- Central Bohemia (01)
- South Bohemia (02)
- West Bohemia (03)
- Northern Bohemia (04)
- East Bohemia (05)
- South Moravia (06)
- Northern Moravia (07)

== Services ==
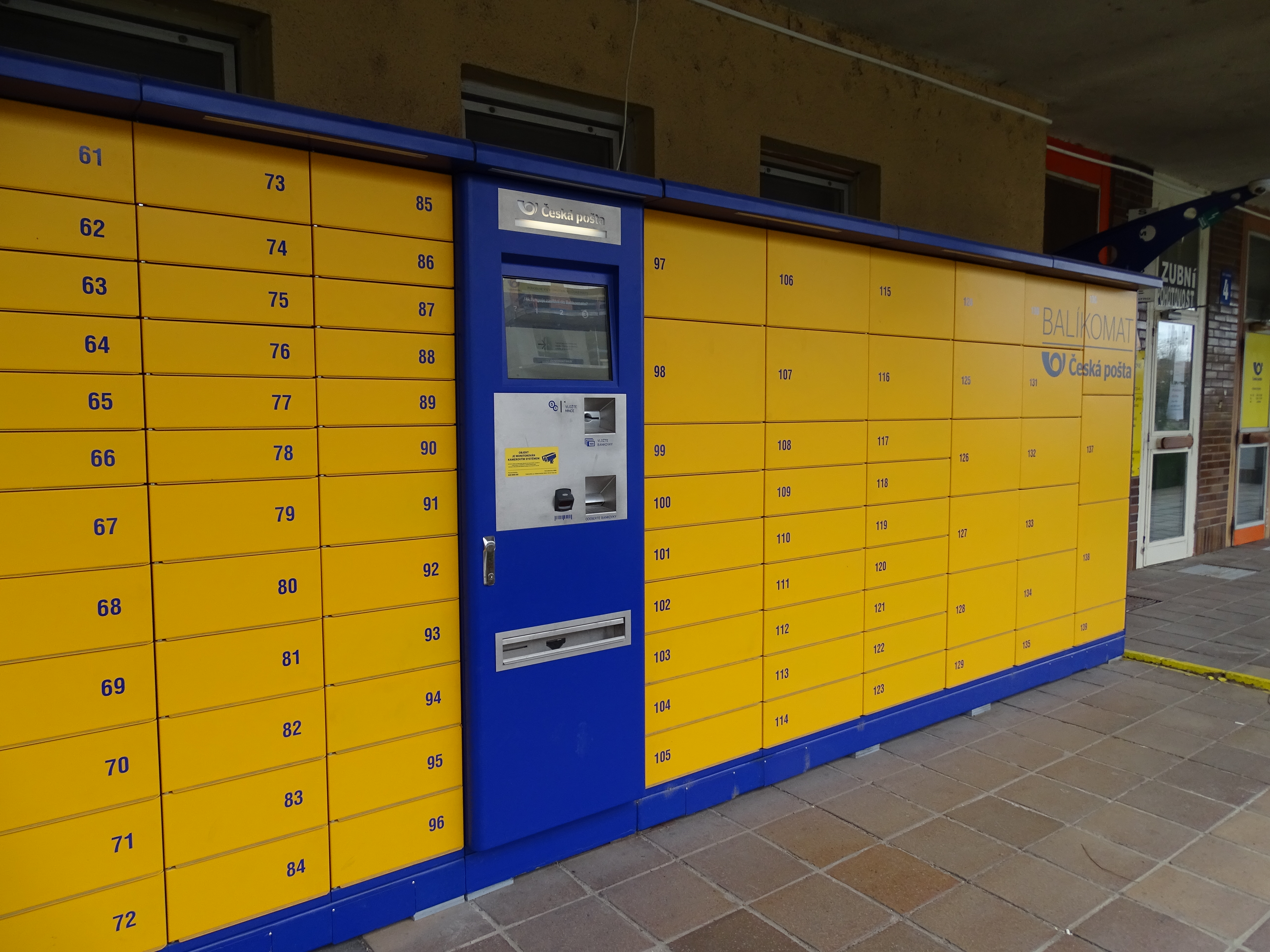
Package machine.

In addition to receiving, transporting and delivering mail and unaddressed items, the Czech Post provides contractual services for other business entities or authorities such as ČSSZ (payment of old-age pensions), ČSOB (renting space for banking services), Sazka (receiving tickets, paying out winnings, selling lottery tickets) and Generali Česká pojišťovna. Furthermore, the Czech Post pays the costs of issuing postage stamps and puts postage stamps into circulation (including the issue plan and services to philatelists, etc.).

=== Czech POINT ===
Czech POINT is an abbreviation for Czech Submission Verification Information National Terminal, which is an assisted place of public administration. The Czech Post offers this service at almost 1000 branches, where clients can obtain verified outputs from the criminal register, Czech Land Registry Office, request new access data to a data box or register a trade. At the branches marked with the Czech POINT logo, it is also possible to perform document verification and signature verification.

=== Pošta Partner ===
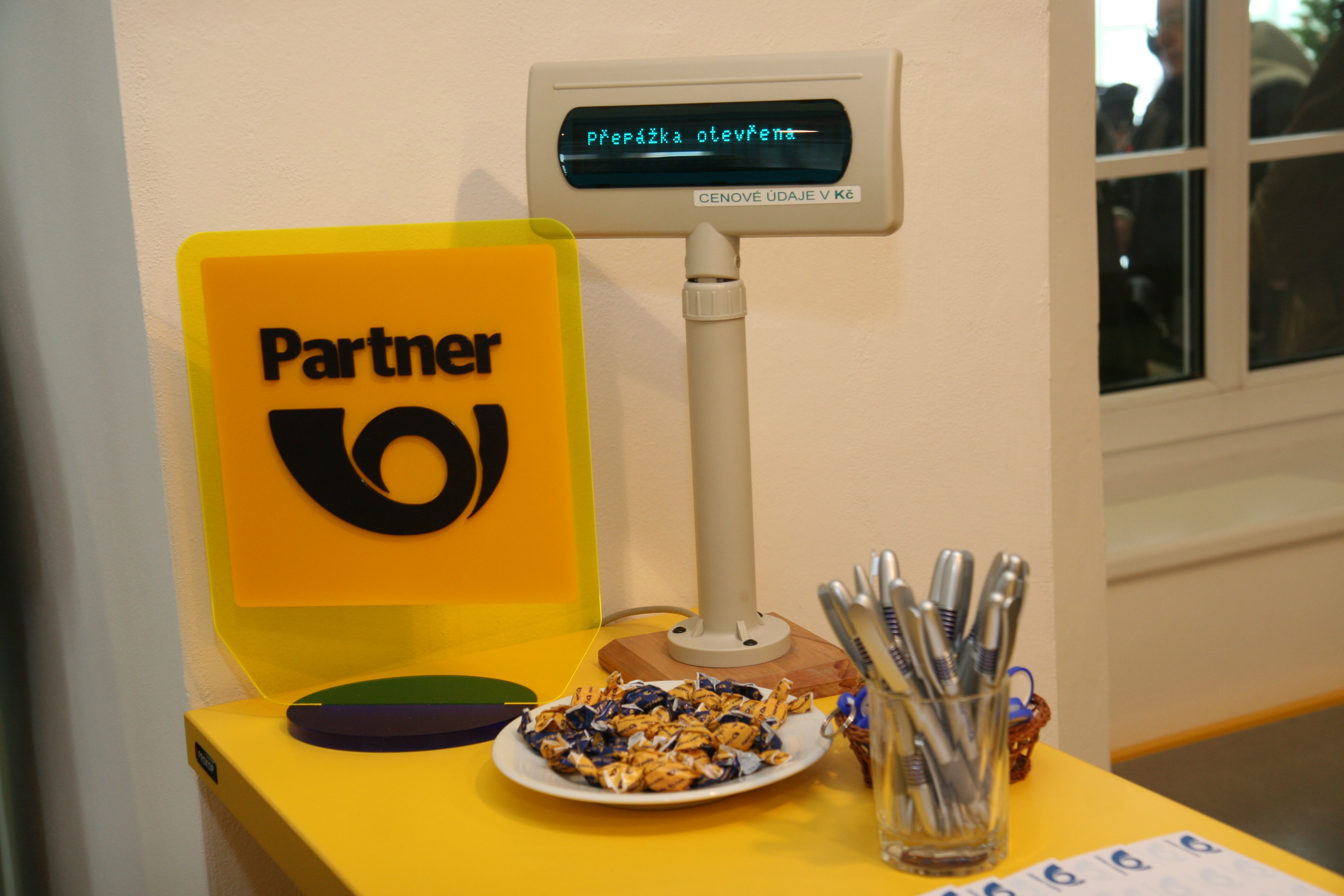
Pošta Partner office in Boží Dar.

The Czech Post began preparing the Pošta Partner project in 2008. In December 2009, the first branch of Pošta Partner was opened in Boží Dar. The purpose of the whole project is to transfer some of the branches to post offices operated by a third party, similar to what is done abroad. As of the end of 2017, there were a total of 428 Partner Post Offices in the Czech Republic.

=== Sorting and transport ===
Shipments, from feeder post offices and from mailbox collections, are sorted at the collection transport hubs (SPUs). Sorting means that the most suitable direction (according to the address) and the optimum mode of transport (according to the type of shipment and the service chosen by the sender) are determined for them. The Czech Post currently uses two types of mail transport within its national transport network:

- road
- rail

To, and from some European countries, postal items are also transported by land (road). For postal connections with the rest of the world, the Czech Post uses mainly air and, in some cases, sea lines.

==== Road transport ====
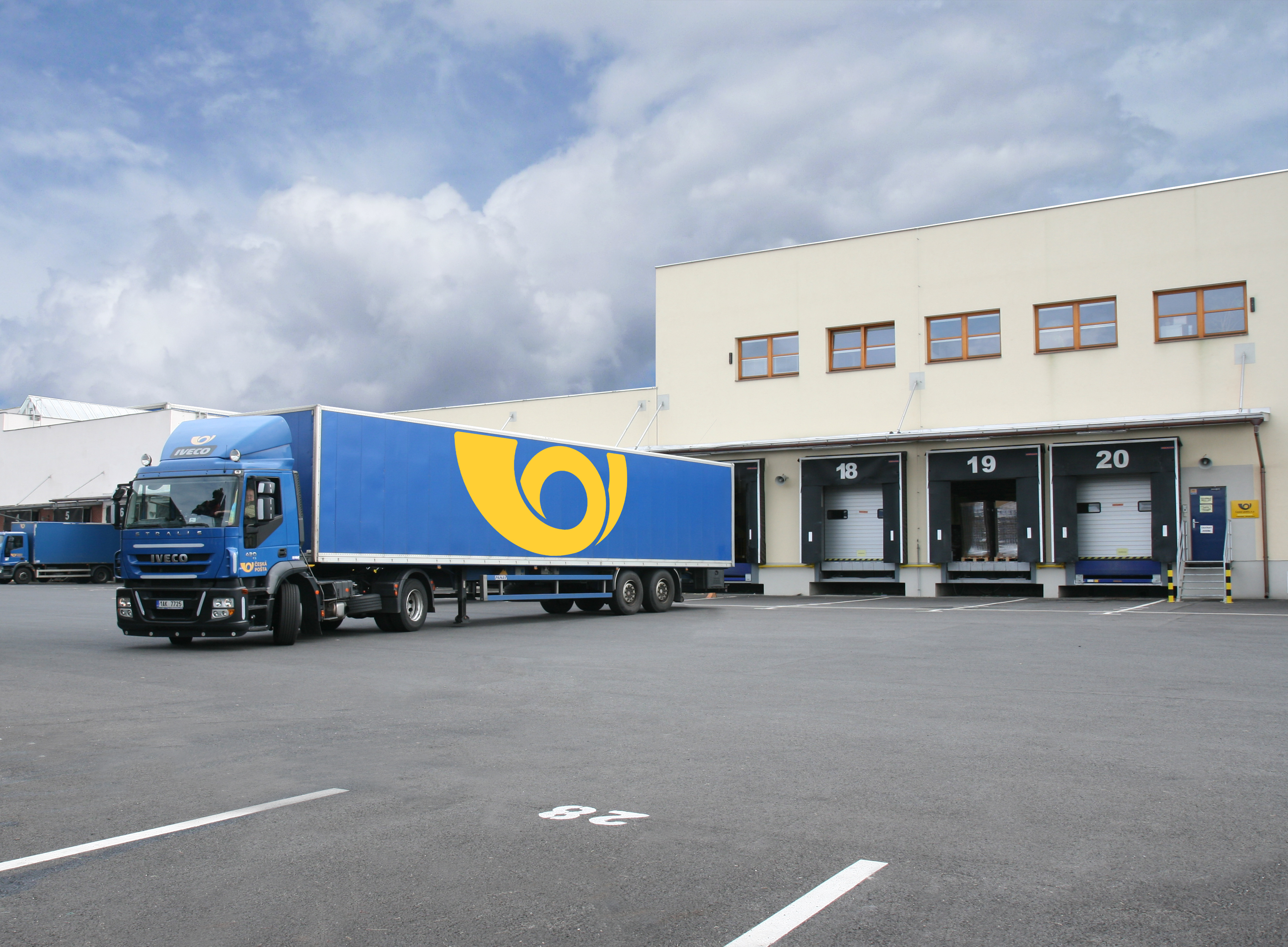
Česka pošta's truck transport.

Transportation of shipments by road is used by the Czech Post for postal connections between individual SPUs throughout the Czech Republic and for connections between individual SPUs and the postal establishments (depots, depots and post offices) under their jurisdiction. At present, the Czech Post uses practically all types of road vehicles, from passenger cars to semi-trailer trucks.

From 2022, the Czech Post outsourced a large part of the road parcel service (that provided by cars over 3.5 tonnes) to C.S.CARGO

==== Rail transport ====
Czech Post uses rail transport for postal connections between some collection hubs. The shipments are transported in closed mail wagons marked with the Czech Post logo and the code VKM POSTA.59 The unloading and loading is carried out by the employees of the individual collection hubs. The actual transport between the collection transport hubs is provided for Czech Post by the contractual carrier ČD Cargo. The transport is carried out either in individual wagons attached to Nex or Rn category trains or by complete mail trains.
