= Asphales =

The Asphales holding, now Fortales, was founded by Piet Van Waeyenberge in 1988.

== History ==
In the wake of the attempted take-over of the Société Générale de Belgique by Carlo De Benedetti, Piet Van Waeyenberge wanted to create an investment instrument to provide for capital for Belgian companies in order to prevent hostile foreign takeovers. Several Belgian businesspeople participated in the holding, such as Paul Janssen (Janssen Pharmaceutica), the Santens family, the Holdifima group of the families Plouvier-Kreglinger. Later on the families Debaillie, Sabbe (ex-Prado), Moortgat (Duvel Moortgat Brewery) and Versele (Versele-Laga) joined the initiative. The holding bought shares of AG Group, a large Belgian insurer, one of the predecessors of what would become Fortis.

== See also ==
- Almanij

== Sources ==
- Dynasty IN België
- Fortis & Cie : victoire... confortable
