= Jan Hinnekens =

Belgian agricultural leader (1927–2013)

- Born: 16 May 1927; Tielt
- Died: 5 October 2013 (aged 86); Leuven

Jan Hinnekens (16 May 1927 – 5 October 2013) was a Belgian agricultural leader who served as president of the Boerenbond, the Belgian Catholic farmers' association, from 1981 to 1992.

== Early life ==
Hinnekens was born in Tielt on 16 May 1927. He trained as a jurist.

== Career ==
Hinnekens spent his whole career at the Boerenbond, a body that combined the roles of a cooperative and a farmers' union, and was continuously active there for 39 years. He became deputy general secretary in 1959 and later general secretary. In those posts he was tasked with guiding members through the shift to modern farm management and broade agricultural markets, and with restructuring the organisation.

In 1979 he became vice-president. In 1981 the Boerenbond's central board appointed him president, succeeding Dries Dequae, and he held the post until 1992, when Robert Eeckloo succeeded him. According to the Boerenbond, his main concern during his eleven years as president was to pass the Boerenbond group on intact to his successors. Because of the Boerenbond's economic weight, its president was also a significant figure in the Belgian financial establishment.

At European level, Hinnekens was treasurer of the International Federation of Agricultural Producers and a member of the presidium of Copa. The Boerenbond described him as a "believer" in the European project who opposed any form of "nationalisation" of agricultural policy; the regionalisation of Belgian agricultural policy took place in 1992, a year after his retirement. He was elected a foreign member of the Académie d'agriculture de France in 1989.

== Death ==
Hinnekens died in Leuven on 5 October 2013, aged 86. He was buried on 12 October at the cemetery of Park Abbey in Heverlee, after a funeral service at the Church of St. John the Baptist in Leuven.

== Publications ==
- Hinnekens, Jan (1966). Ontstaan en groei van het sociaal katholicisme in België, Christelijke organisaties in nieuw perspectief (in Dutch). Antwerp.
