= 365.bank =

Retail bank based in Slovakia

365.bank, a. s.
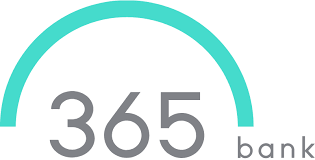

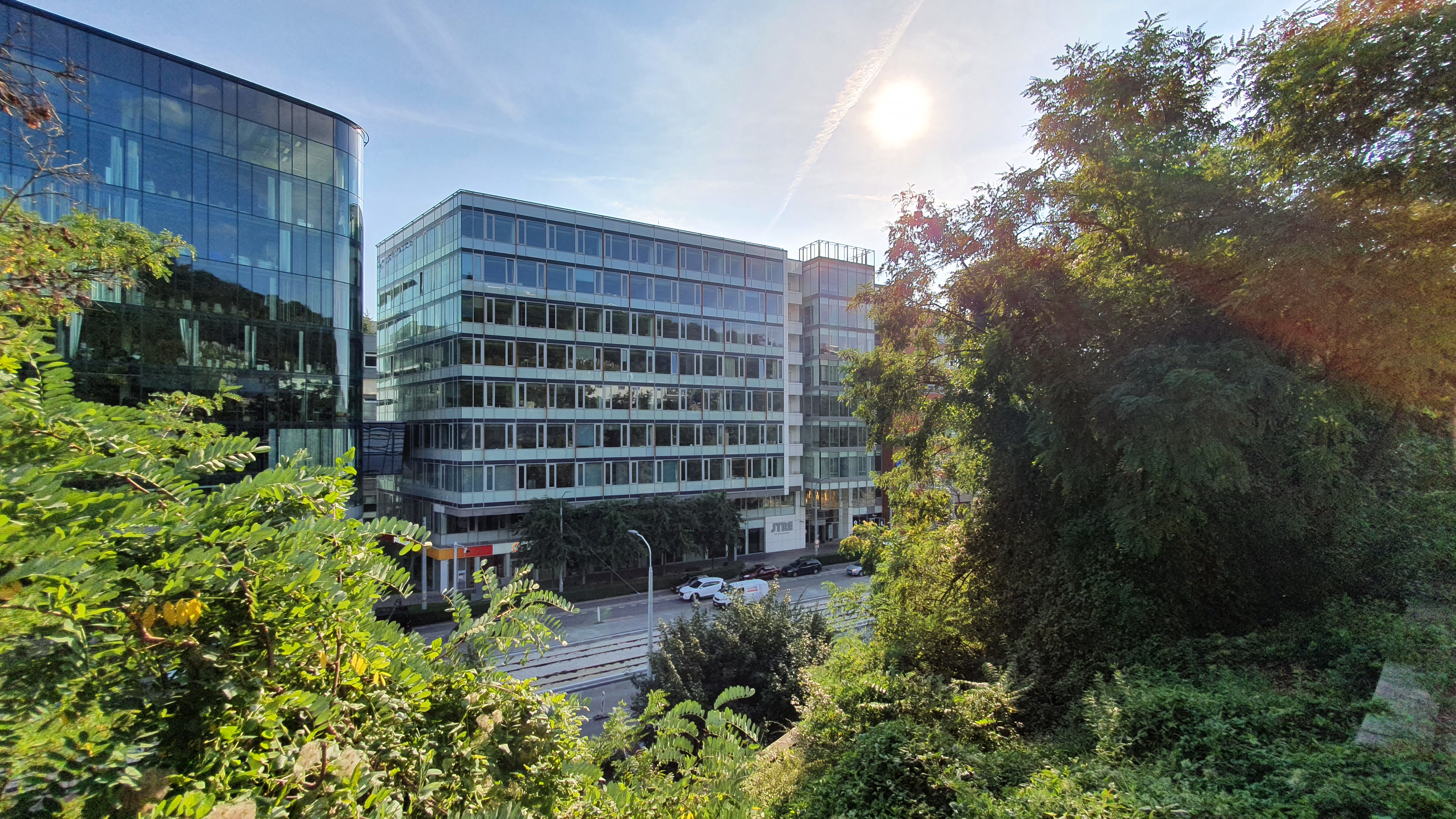
- 365.bank and Poštová banka headquarters in Bratislava
- Type: Public
- Industry: Financial services
- Founded: 1992; 34 years ago
- Headquarters: Bratislava, Slovakia
- Area served: Slovakia
- Key people: Daniel Kollár (CEO)
- Products: Banking services, asset management, factoring, leasing
- Revenue: €67.6 million
- Total assets: €4.7bn (Q4 2024)
- Owner: KBC Group
- Number of employees: 616 (2024)
- Website: 365.bank; postovabanka.sk

365.bank is a Slovak retail bank operating across Slovakia. The bank also includes the brands Poštová banka, 365.invest, 365.nadácia, 365.fintech, Ahoj, PB Finančné služby, SKPAY, PB Servis, and Cards.

== History ==
365.bank was founded in 1992 as a digital bank. In 2021, 365.bank replaced its former parent company, Poštová banka, as head of the conglomerate, assuming control of Poštová banka's network of brick-and-mortar branches.

On May 15, 2025, KBC Group announced it would acquire the Slovak firm for €761 million; at the time, 365.bank was controlled by J&T Group. KBC said that the purchase and merger of 365.bank with its ČSOB would expand its footprint in Slovakia, as 365.bank had a 3.7% market share in December 2024.

In January 2026, KBC announced that it had completed the intended transaction for €708 million, resulting in the Bratislava-based bank being 98.45% controlled by KBC Bank NV. In September 2026, KBC announced that it would merge 365.bank into ČSOB on November 1stwhile also continuing to use the two brands until 2027 and the planned completion of the migration of 365.bank's customers to ČSOB's systems.

== Recognition ==
- 2025, Best Digital Bank in Slovakia at the Euromoney Awards.
- 2025, listed in Top 50 Banking Brands by The Banker & Kantar BrandZ as the only Slovak bank.
- 2024, Best Digital Bank in Slovakia at the Euromoney Awards.
- 2024, Issuer of the Year and Sustainability Award at the Mastercard Awards.
- 2024, 1st place in Best Internal Communication Event at the FEIEA Grand Prix.
- 2024, Gold award in Public Relations, Community Relations and Internal Communication at Zlatý klinec.
- 2024, 3rd place in the Best Employer 2023 poll in the Banking, Finance and Insurance category.
- 2023, Communicator of the Year (Corporate Social Responsibility) at the Hermes Awards.
- 2023, 3rd place in the Best Employer 2023 poll in the Banking, Finance and Insurance category.
- 2023, 1st place in the Euromoney Awards for Excellence in the ESG category as the best bank in this area in Slovakia.
- 2023, 3rd place in the Best Employer 2022 poll in the Banking, Finance and Insurance category.
- 2022, Discovery of the Year at the Zlatá Minca Awards 2022.
- 2022, Issuer of the Year and Unique Issuing Project Award in the Mastercard Awards 2022.
- 2021, Bank of the Year 2021 in Slovakia according to British magazine The Banker.

== Controversies ==
In 2023, the Slovak police fined 365.bank €2 million for neglecting concerns of money laundering and terrorist financing.

== See also ==
- List of banks in the euro area
- List of banks in Slovakia
