= Jozef Van Waeyenberge =

Belgian businessman

Jozef Van Waeyenberge is a Belgian businessman. He is a son of Camille Van Waeyenberge and a brother of Piet Van Waeyenberge one of the founders, and currently president, of De Warande.

After he finished high school, he immediately embarked on a career in business. He is Director of various companies, including the Van Waeyenberge family holding De Eik. In addition, he is also director of a number of professional organisations and cultural associations. He was appointed Director of Almanij in 1995 and Director of the KBC Group in 2005, when Almanij ceased to exist as a separate entity and merged with KBC to form the KBC Group.
