= United Bulgarian Bank =

Bulgarian commercial banking institution

- Native name: Обединена българска банка
- Founded: 1992
- Headquarters: Sofia, Bulgaria
- Key people: Peter Andronov (CEO)
- Total assets: €19,15 billion (2024)
- Total equity: €2,15 million (2024)
- Parent: KBC Group N.V. (100%)
- Website: ubb.bg

United Bulgarian Bank (Bulgarian: Обединена българска банка; UBB) is a Bulgarian commercial bank. It is the first and largest banking consolidation project in Bulgaria, accomplished through the merger of 22 state-owned commercial banks. UBB was established on 30 September 1992. UBB manages assets worth approximately лв. 6,600,000,000 and operates nearly 200 branches and banking structures. UBB's subsidiaries are UBB Asset Management, UBB Factoring and UBB Insurance Broker.

== History ==
United Bulgarian Bank is the first large-scale project for banking consolidation in Bulgaria. It was founded on 30 September 1992 through the merger of 22 regional state-owned banks:

Botevgradska Commercial Bank AD, Vrachanska Commercial Bank AD, Gabrovska Commercial Bank AD, Commercial Bank Doverie AD, Commercial Bank Elhovo AD, Commercial Bank Iskar AD, Kardzhaliyska Commercial Bank AD, Loveshka Commercial Bank AD, Mihaylovgradska Commercial Bank AD, Novozagorska Commercial Bank AD, Pazardzhishka Commercial Bank AD, Pernishka Commercial Bank AD, Peshterska Commercial Bank AD, Plevenska Commercial Bank AD, Popovska Commercial Bank AD, Rusenska Commercial Bank AD, Samokovska Commercial Bank AD, Slivenska Commercial Bank AD, Commercial Bank Stroybank AD, Targovishtka Commercial Bank AD, Haskovska Commercial Bank AD and Shumenska Commercial Bank.

In 1997, UBB was acquired by a consortium of the European Bank for Reconstruction and Development (EBRD), BULBANK and Oppenheimer & Co., becoming the first privatised state-owned bank in Bulgaria.

On 20 July 2000, BULBANK AD, CIBC World Markets (formerly Oppenheimer & Co.), Jodrell Enterprises and the European Bank for Reconstruction and Development sold the National Bank of Greece (NBG) 68,289,905 shares of UBB, which rendered the NBG majority shareholder of UBB with 89.9% share participation. The European Bank for Reconstruction and Development retained a 10% share. In 2002, the European Bank for Reconstruction and Development sold the National Bank of Greece its 10% share.

In December 2016, KBC Group announced its purchase of UBB and Interlease for €610,000,000. This made KBC the largest bank-insurance group in the country. The CIBANK banks were renamed United Bulgarian Bank.

== See also ==
- List of banks in Bulgaria
