= KBC Bank Ireland =

KBC Ireland Bank plc
- Type: Public
- Industry: Finance
- Founded: 14 February 1973 in Dublin, Ireland
- Defunct: 30 April 2024
- Headquarters: Dublin, Cork, Limerick, Galway, Waterford and Belfast
- Key people: Peter Roebben (CEO)
- Products: Multiple banking products
- Total assets: Loan Book of €10 Billion and Deposits of €5 Billion (2016)
- Number of employees: 1000 (2016)
- Website: www.kbc.ie

KBC Bank Ireland plc was a bank in Ireland with offices in Dublin, Cork, Limerick, Galway, Waterford and Belfast.

It was established in 1972 as Irish Intercontinental Bank. In 1978 KBC Bank, which is headquartered in Brussels, acquired a 75% interest. KBC Bank acquired a full 100% shareholding in IIB in 1999, and in 2000 the bank's name changed to IIB Bank. On 27 October 2008, the 30th anniversary of KBC's majority ownership, the bank was renamed KBC Bank Ireland plc.

KBC Bank Ireland provided a wide range of banking services including Corporate, Commercial and Business Banking, Private Banking and Treasury & Capital Markets. Its mortgage division, KBC Homeloans, was a leading mortgage provider in Ireland.

KBC began operating a branch network in 2012 with a further build-out in 2014. This followed the exit of Halifax Ireland and Danske Bank from the Irish retail market, with some branches being located in former locations of those banks.

KBC initiated a high-profile property repossession in Strokestown, in County Roscommon in December 2018. Following this, there was a violent attack by a gang of masked men on the team employed by KBC to occupy the house.

In April 2021, KBC entered into talks with Bank of Ireland to sell its performing loan book and announced its intention to withdraw from Ireland.

== KBC in Ireland ==
KBC had 1000+ employees in Ireland in the following companies:

- KBC Bank Ireland plc
- KBC Fund Management

== See also ==
- List of banks in the Republic of Ireland
