= Georges Vandevoorde =

Belgian sculptor

- Born: 30 April 1878; Kortrijk, Belgium
- Died: 17 June 1964 (aged 86); Anderlecht, Belgium
- Occupation: Sculptor

Georges Vandevoorde (30 April 1878 – 17 June 1964) was a Belgian sculptor. His work was part of the sculpture event in the art competition at the 1936 Summer Olympics.
