= André Vlerick =

Belgian politician, businessman and professor

- Born: 11 September 1919; Kortrijk, Belgium
- Died: 3 December 1990 (aged 71); Beernem, West Flanders, Belgium
- Education: Ghent University
- Occupations: Politician, businessman, professor

André, Baron Vlerick (11 September 1919 – 3 December 1990) was a Belgian politician, businessman, professor and founder of the Vlerick Leuven Gent Management School. He graduated in economy at the University of Ghent and was appointed at the University of Leuven as well as the University of Ghent as Professor of Economics. He founded the department of regional economy at the University of Ghent. He is also the founder of Protea, a pro-apartheid Belgian organisation which assisted the South African apartheid government in money laundering and circumventing sanctions through Kredietbank. Vlerick's lobbying efforts extended to a pan-European formation called Eurosa. In addition to Protea in Belgium, there were “sister organisations” in Austria, Britain, Denmark, France, Italy, the Netherlands, Switzerland and West Germany. Evidence collected from Vlerick's archive has established that Eurosa received direct funding from the apartheid government. A member of the Christian People's Party he was appointed during various Belgian Governments in the 1960s-1970s as Minister of the Flemish Regional Economy, actually till his appointment as Minister of Finance in 1972. He was also appointed after the war as the Administrator of the Marshall Plan for Belgium. He was instrumental in the post-war years of the successful Flemish economic development. André Vlerick was a son-in-law of Gustave Sap and the uncle of Philippe Vlerick.

== Publications ==
- U.S. Foreign business operations seen by a European Stanford Business Conference, Stanford University (US) 1960.

== Sources ==
- Aloïs Van De Voorde, André Vlerick : een minister-manager - een politieke biografie, Lannoo, Tielt, 1996.
