= Philippe Vlerick =

Belgian businessman

Philippe, Baron Vlerick (born 8 June 1955), is a Belgian businessman. He was born in Kortrijk, the son of Lucien Vlerick and Thérèse Vandewiele. He is a nephew of André Vlerick and married to Patricia Bouckaert.

== Career ==
He is chairman and CEO of the denim producer Uco Textiles and also manages Bic Carpets, a manufacturer of designer carpets founded by his father in 1956. In 2005, he started on a strategic alliance with the Indian Raymond Group. In 2006, he was Manager of the Year in Belgium. He is a member of the board of directors of the Vlerick Business School and a Director of the KBC Group. In November 2011, Vlerick was convicted of environmental crimes committed by UCO Sportswear in Ghent. Following the Ghent Court of Appeal's ruling, the conviction was upheld by the Court of Cassation in September 2012.

=== functions ===
- Commisaris general of Europalia India
- President of the Belgo-Indian Chamber of Commerce & Industry" (BICC & I).

== Honours ==
- 2008: Created Baron Vlerick, by command of King Albert.
- 2013: commander in the Order of Leopold.

== Sources ==
- DE VERANKERAARS VAN KBC GROEP: wie is wie? (in Dutch)
- Raad van bestuur nieuwe KBC Groep (in Dutch)
