= Boerenbond =

Farmers organization in Belgium

- Founded: 1890
- Headquarters: Diestsevest 40, 3000 Leuven
- Location: Belgium
- Key people: Sonja De Becker
- Website: boerenbond.be

The Boerenbond (Dutch: [ˌbuːrə(m)ˈbɔnt]; German: Bauernbund [ˈbaʊɐnˌbʊnt]; lit. 'Farmers' League') is a professional association of farmers active in the Flemish and German-speaking communities of Belgium. Founded in 1890 and based in Leuven, the Boerenbond as an organisation promotes the interests of farmers working within its regions of activity and has historically been closely associated with Catholic political parties.

In the 1920s, it had 100,000 members divided into 1,050 guilds, and it was "intimately connected with the Catholic church". In politics, it was "an important part of the strong Catholic party".

The organisation is politically right-wing and has historically been influential within national Christian Democratic politics. Today it has particular prominence within the Christen-Democratisch en Vlaams (CD&V) and Christlich Soziale Partei (CSP) parties.

The Boerenbond competes with the rival Algemeen Boerensyndicaat (ABS) organisation.

== List of presidents ==
- 1890-1925: Joris Helleputte
- 1925-36: Victor Parein
- 1936-40: Gilbert Mullie
- 1940-49: Alfons Conix
- 1949-61: Gilbert Mullie
- 1961-64: Maurits Van Hemelrijck
- 1964-77: Constant Boon
- 1977-81: André Dequae
- 1981-92: Jan Hinnekens
- 1992-95: Robert Eeckloo
- 1995-2008: Noël Devisch
- 2008-15: Piet Vanthemsche
- 2015–22: Sonja De Becker
- 2022-present: Lode Ceyssens
