= Almanij =

Belgian holding company

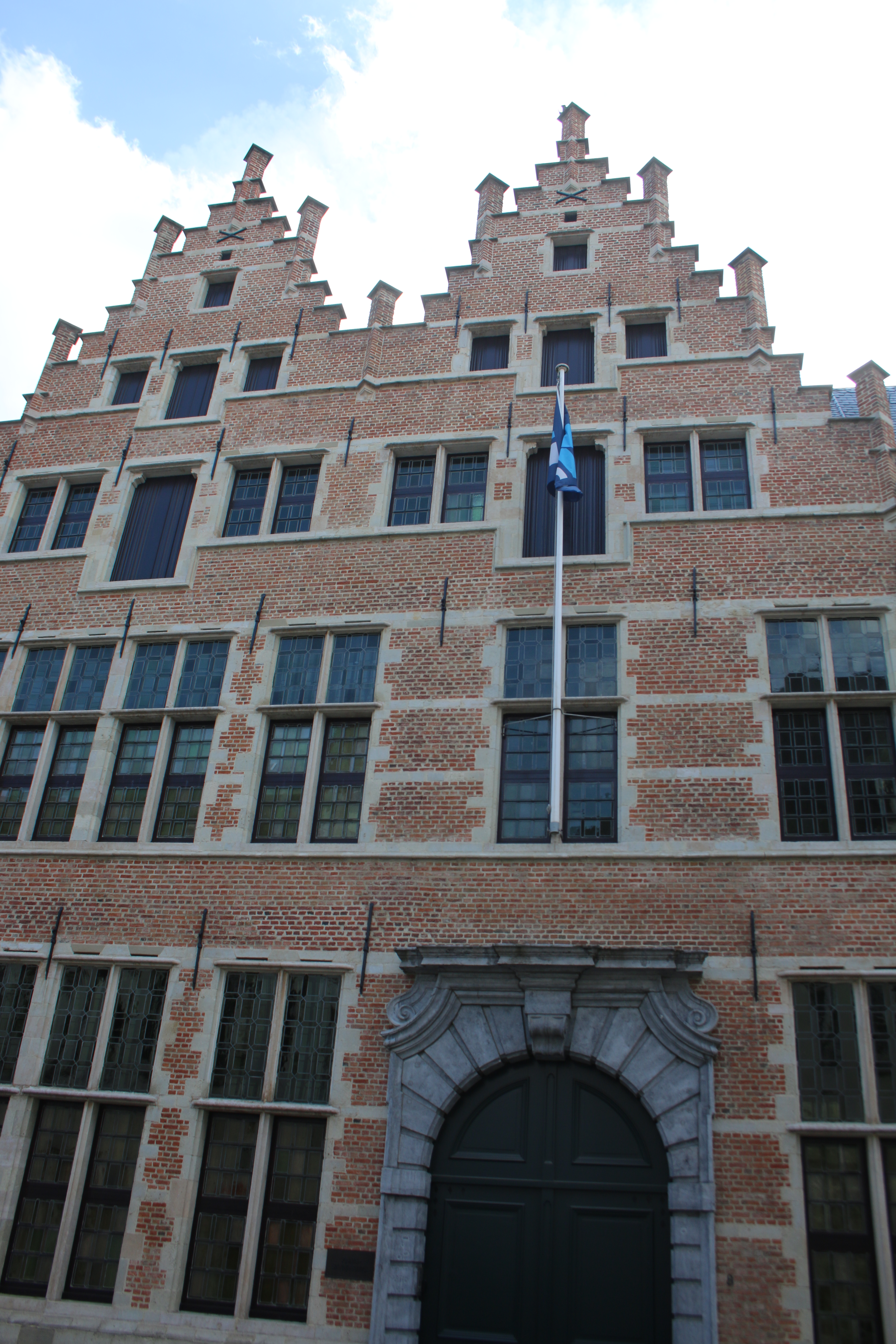
the Snydershuis in Antwerp (Keizerstraat 8), former seat of Almanij

Almanij (for Algemene Maatschappij voor Nijverheidskrediet, "General Credit Company for Industry") was a Belgian holding company active in financial services, created in 1931 and merged into KBC Group in March 2005.

== History ==
Almanij was incorporated in 1931 as an initiative of the Catholic Algemeene Bankvereeniging, a Belgian bank founded by the Leuvense Volksbank (Leuven) in Antwerp in 1921. This was done in order to regroup its industrial holdings in Belgium and Hungary. In 1935, the Middenkredietkas went nearly bankrupt due to the economic crisis, which led to the establishment of the Kredietbank of which Almanij became a shareholder. The Catholic Boerenbond (E: Belgian Farmers’ Union) created its own network of savings banks: CERA instead of relying on the Middenkredietkas, which was closely related to the Algemeene Bankvereeniging. In 1949, the Kredietbank Luxembourgeoise was founded in Luxembourg, which specialized in private banking.

In 1997, Almanij gained control of Gevaert, an investment company created in 1981 by Andre Leysen to manage the proceeds of the sale of Agfa-Gevaert to the German company, Bayer. Almanij acquired all shares of Gevaert in 2002. In 1998, Kredietbank Group with CERA Bank and Assurantiën Belgische Boerenbond (E:ABB-insurance) merged into KBC Bank and Insurance Group. In 2004, all activities outside the KBC and KBL groups were transferred to Gevaert.

Almanij used to hold four stakes in major companies:

- Gevaert NV (investment company which owns 27.2% of Agfa-Gevaert) (Almanij 100%)
- Almafin (Almanij 100%)
- KBC Bank (Almanij 69.18%)
- Kredietbank Luxembourgeoise (KBL) (Almanij 78.60%)

In 2005, Almanij ceased to exist as a separate entity when it merged with KBC to form the KBC Group.

== See also ==
- ARCO Group
- Asphales

== Sources ==
- Almanij
- Het bank- en verzekeringsgswezen in Antwerpen tijdens het interbellum (Dutch)
- Fusie van KBC en Almanij (Dutch)
- Van Middenkredietkas tot Almanij (Dutch)
- Kbc neemt Almanij over (Dutch)
