= List of companies of Slovakia =

Location of Slovakia

Slovakia is a landlocked country in Central Europe. The capital and largest city is Bratislava. The official language is Slovak.

Slovakia is a high-income advanced economy with a very high Human Development Index, a very high standard of living and performs favourably in measurements of civil liberties, press freedom, internet freedom, democratic governance and peacefulness. The country maintains a combination of market economy with universal health care and a comprehensive social security system. The country joined the European Union in 2004 and the Eurozone on 1 January 2009. Slovakia is also a member of the Schengen Area, NATO, the United Nations, the OECD, the WTO, CERN, the OSCE, the Council of Europe and the Visegrád Group. The Slovak economy is one of the fastest-growing economies in Europe and 3rd fastest in eurozone. Its legal tender, the Euro, is the world's 2nd most traded currency. Although regional income inequality is high, 90% of citizens own their homes. In 2016, Slovak citizens had visa-free or visa-on-arrival access to 165 countries and territories, ranking the Slovak passport 11th in the world. Slovakia is the world's biggest per-capita car producer with a total of 1,040,000 cars manufactured in the country in 2016 alone. The car industry represents 43 percent of Slovakia's industrial output, and a quarter of its exports.

For further information on the types of business entities in this country and their abbreviations, see "Business entities in Slovakia".

== Notable firms ==
This list includes notable companies with primary headquarters located in the country. The industry and sector follow the Industry Classification Benchmark taxonomy. Organizations which have ceased operations are included and noted as defunct.

Notable companies Status: P=Private, S=State; A=Active, D=Defunct
Name	Industry	Sector	Headquarters	Founded	Notes	Status	
Air Slovakia	Consumer services	Airlines	Bratislava	1993	Airline, defunct 2010	P	D
Doprastav	Industrials	Heavy construction	Bratislava	1953	Infrastructure construction	P	A
Elnec	Industrials	Electronic equipment	Prešov	1991	Commercial electronics	P	A
ESET	Technology	Computer services	Bratislava	1992	IT security	P	A
Glass LPS	Consumer goods	Durable household products	Medzilaborce	1999	Glass products	P	A
Istrobanka	Financials	Banks	Bratislava	1992	Commercial bank, defunct 2009	P	D
J&T Finance Group	Financials	Investment services	Bratislava	1993	Investments	P	A
JTRE	Real estate	Real estate management & development	Bratislava	1996	Real estate development	P	A
JJ Electronic	Industrials	Electrical components & equipment	Čadca	1993	Vacuum tubes	P	A
Komerční banka Bratislava	Financials	Banks	Bratislava	1995	Commercial bank	P	A
Matador	Consumer goods	Tires	Púchov	1947	Tires, part of Continental AG (Germany)	P	A
OFZ, a.s., Istebné,	Basic materials	Iron & steel	Istebné	1999	Ferroalloys	P	A
Orange Slovensko	Telecommunications	Mobile telecommunications	Bratislava	1997	Mobile network, part of Orange S.A. (France)	P	A
Penta Investments	Financials	Investment services	Bratislava	1994	Investments	P	A
Poštová banka	Financials	Banks	Bratislava	1992	Commercial bank	P	A
Railways of the Slovak Republic	Industrials	Railroads	Bratislava	1993	State-owned railway	S	A
Šariš Brewery	Consumer goods	Brewers	Veľký Šariš	1964	Brewery, part of Asahi Breweries (Japan)	P	A
Slovak Airlines	Consumer services	Airlines	Bratislava	1995	Airline, defunct 2007	P	D
Slovak Telekom	Telecommunications	Fixed line telecommunications	Bratislava	1999	Telecom, part of Deutsche Telekom (Germany)	P	A
Slovalco	Basic materials	Aluminum	Žiar nad Hronom	1993	Aluminum	P	A
Slovart Music	Consumer services	Broadcasting & entertainment	Bratislava	1993	Music publisher	P	A
Slovenská pošta	Industrials	Delivery services	Banská Bystrica	1993	State-owned post	S	A
Slovenská sporiteľňa	Financials	Banks	Bratislava	1819	Commercial bank, part of Erste Group (Austria)	P	A
Slovenské elektrárne	Utilities	Conventional electricity	Bratislava	1942	Electric utility, part of Enel (Italy)	P	A
Slovenský plynárenský priemysel	Oil & gas	Exploration & production	Bratislava	2006	Natural gas	P	A
Slovnaft	Oil & gas	Exploration & production	Bratislava	1949	Oil refining, part of MOL Group (Hungary)	P	A
Sygic	Technology	Software	Bratislava	2004	Off-line navigation	P	A
Tatra banka	Financials	Banks	Bratislava	1990	Commercial bank, part of Raiffeisen Bank International (Austria)	P	A
O2 Slovakia	Telecommunications	Mobile telecommunications	Bratislava	2006	Mobile network, part of PPF (Netherlands)	P	A
Topvar	Consumer goods	Brewers	Veľký Šariš	1957	Brewery, part of Asahi Breweries (Japan)	P	A
Transpetrol AS	Oil & gas	Pipelines	Bratislava	1954	Oil transport	P	A
U. S. Steel Košice	Basic materials	Iron & steel	Košice	2000	Steel, part of U.S. Steel (US)	P	A
Vagónka	Industrials	Commercial vehicles & trucks	Trebišov	1922	Railway, shipping containers	P	A
Webglobe	Technology	Internet	Bratislava	1999	Web hosting and domain registration	P	A
Železničná spoločnosť Slovensko	Industrials	Railroads	Bratislava	2004	State-owned railway	S	A
Zlatý Bažant	Consumer goods	Brewers	Hurbanovo	1969	Brewery, part of Heineken International (Netherlands)	P	A

== See also ==
- Economy of Slovakia
- List of banks in Slovakia
- List of supermarket chains in Slovakia
