= Slovenské energetické strojárne =

- Company type: private
- Industry: Power engineering, Energy, Mechanical engineering
- Headquarters: Tlmače, Slovakia
- Products: boilers, power engineering equipment
- Services: development, design, manufacture, assembly, commissioning
- Number of employees: 1873 - 31 December 2010
- Website: www.ses.sk

Slovenské energetické strojárne a.s. (SES Tlmače) (English: Slovak Energy Machines) is a Slovak joint-stock company primarily engaged in the design, manufacture and assembly of power engineering equipment. It is headquartered in the Slovak city Tlmače. As of 2012 the company is in the process of merging into the EP Industries holding owned by the Slovak investment company J&T and Czech billionaire Daniel Křetínský.

== Description ==
The Company provides boilers for combustion of coal, oil, gas and biomass and determined for thermal power plants or combined heating and power plants as well as incinerating plants. In addition to equipment for power engineering, the slovenske energeticke strojarne, gas, metallurgy and consumer goods industry. It also provides services in power engineering: development, designing, manufacture, assembly and commissioning. Its products are divided in five segments: power plants; boilers; condensers, heat exchangers and pipelines; steel constructions and other equipment.

It is operational through a number of subsidiaries, including SES Hungaria Kft., based in Hungary, SES Bohemia sro, based in the Czech Republic, and SES Chile, based in Chile, among others.

== History ==
The company was founded in the 1950s in Czechoslovakia. It was transformed into a joint-stock company in 1992. Since August 2006, the majority shareholder of SES Tlmače is a Cypriot company Segfield Investment, part of the J&T Group, one of two biggest investment companies in Slovakia. In May 2012, the company announced its plan to lay off 300 employees.

== See also ==
- List of companies of Slovakia
- Economy of Slovakia
