= Economy of Slovakia =

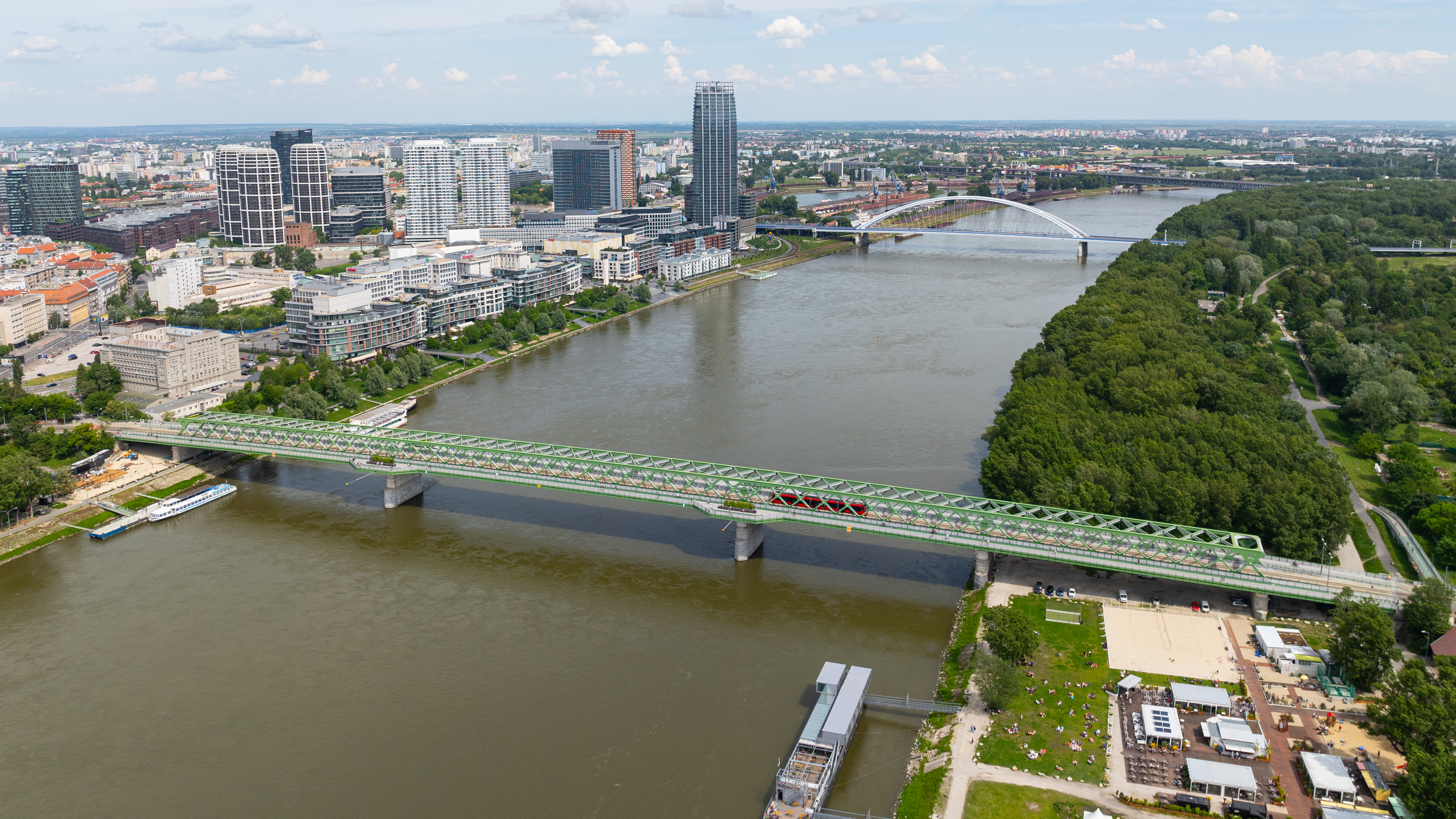
- Bratislava is the economic centre of Slovakia
- Currency: Euro (EUR, €)
- Fiscal year: Calendar year
- Trade organisations: EU, WTO, OECD
- Country group: Advanced economy; High-income economy

Statistics
- Population: ▼5,405,368 (2026)
- GDP: ▲$168.90 billion (nominal; 2026); ▲$267.42 billion (PPP; 2026)
- GDP rank: 58th (nominal; 2026); 47th (PPP; 2026)
- GDP growth: 1.7% (2026)
- GDP per capita: ▲$31,247 (nominal; 2026); ▲$49,473 (PPP; 2026)
- GDP per capita rank: 45th (nominal; 2025); 47th (PPP; 2025)
- GDP per capita growth: 1.0% (2025)
- GDP by sector: agriculture: 2%; industry: 28.5%; services: 60%; (2024 est.)
- Inflation (CPI): 11.0% (2023); 3.6% (2024); 3.9% (2025)
- Population below national poverty line: 13.7% (2021); 18.3% at risk of poverty or social exclusion (AROPE 2024)
- Gini coefficient: 21.7 low (2024)
- Human Development Index: 0.855 very high (2022) (45th); 0.808 very high IHDI (2022, 32nd rank)
- Labour force: 2,779,407 (2024); 78.1% employment rate (2024)
- Labour force by occupation: agriculture: 3.9%; industry: 22.7%; services: 73.4%; (2015)
- Unemployment: 5.8% (March 2025)
- Youth unemployment: 18.4% (2025)
- Average gross salary: €1,524 per month
- Average net salary: €1,160 per month
- Main industries: automobiles; metal and metal products; electricity, gas, coke, oil, nuclear fuel; chemicals, synthetic fibers, wood and paper products; machinery; earthenware and ceramics; textiles; electrical and optical apparatus; rubber products; food and beverages; pharmaceutical

External
- Exports: $118.389 billion (2024)
- Export goods: vehicles and related parts 27%, machinery and electrical equipment 20%, nuclear reactors and furnaces 12%, iron and steel 4%, mineral oils and fuels 5% (2015)
- Main export partners: EU 71.27%; Germany 20%; Czechia 10.4%; Hungary 7.71%; Poland 6.64%; Austria 4.6%; United States 6.27%; United Kingdom 5%; China 3.7%; Ukraine 1.7%; Turkey 1.53% (2024)
- Imports: $113.369 billion (2023)
- Import goods: machinery and electrical equipment 20%, vehicles and related parts 14%, nuclear reactors and furnaces 12%, fuel and mineral oils 9% (2015)
- Main import partners: EU 69.02%; Germany 16.4%; Czechia 15.9%; Poland 8.9%; Hungary 6.68%; Austria 3.51%; China 6.39%; Vietnam 4.17%; Russia 4.16%; South Korea 3.32%; United Kingdom 1.6% (2024)
- FDI stock: $69.92 billion (2017); Abroad: $21.29 billion (2017)
- Current account: -$3.895 billion (2024 est.)
- Gross external debt: $75.04 billion (2016)

Public finance
- Government debt: 59.7% of GDP (2024); €77.735 billion (2024)
- Foreign reserves: $9.61 billion (31 December 2021 est.)
- Budget balance: €7.1 billion deficit (2024); −5.5% of GDP (2024)
- Revenue: 42% of GDP (2024)
- Spending: 47.5% of GDP (2024)
- Economic aid: €11.7 billion from European Structural and Investment Funds (2007–2013); €15.32 billion from European Structural and Investment Funds (2014–2020)
- Credit rating: Standard & Poor's: A+ (Domestic); A+ (Foreign); AAA (T&C Assessment); Outlook: Stable; Moody's: A3; Outlook: Stable; Fitch: A-; Outlook: Stable; Scope: A; Outlook: Negative
- All values, unless otherwise stated, are in US dollars.

Slovakia has a developed export-oriented social market economy. It is a member of the European Union since 2004 and is a member of the eurozone since 2009. It is also a member of the WTO and OECD. The capital city Bratislava is the country's largest financial centre and business hub.

The largest component in Slovakia's economy is the service sector (60%), followed by industry (28.5%) and agriculture (2%). Slovakia's industry is heavily focused on the automotive industry as the country is the largest producer of vehicles per capita. Other notable industrial sectors include production of electrical appliances and production of machinery. The Slovak government actively follows a pro-export policy, utilizing agencies such as SARIO and EXIMBANKA to stimulate export growth.

Between 1970 and 1985 real incomes increased by about 50%, they fell in the 1990s. The gross domestic product only returned to its 1989 level in 2007. The Slovak economy rapidly grew between 2000 until 2008, averaging nearly 6% yearly GDP growth. This economic growth was the result of economic liberalization policies pursued during the 2000s and the country's accession to the EU in 2004. During this period Slovakia earned the nickname "Tatra Tiger". Slovakia's economic growth slowed down after 2008, largely due to effects of the 2008 financial crisis and the Great Recession.

== History ==
Since the establishment of the Slovak Republic in January 1993, Slovakia has undergone a transition from a centrally planned economy to a free market economy, a process which some observers were to believe was slowed in the 1994–98 period due to the crony capitalism and other fiscal policies of Prime Minister Vladimír Mečiar's government. While economic growth and other fundamentals improved steadily during Mečiar's term, public and private debt and trade deficits also rose, and privatization was uneven. Real annual GDP growth peaked at 6.5% in 1995 but declined to 1.3% in 1999.

Two governments of the "liberal-conservative" Prime Minister Mikuláš Dzurinda (1998–2006) pursued policies of macroeconomic stabilization and market-oriented structural reforms. Nearly the entire economy has now been privatized, and foreign investment has picked up. Economic growth exceeded expectations in the early 2000s, despite recession in key export markets. In 2001 policies of macroeconomic stabilization and structural reform led to spiraling unemployment. Unemployment peaked at 19.2% (Eurostat regional indicators) in 2001. Solid domestic demand boosted economic growth to 4.1% in 2002. Strong export growth, in turn, pushed economic growth to a still-strong 4.2% in 2003 and 5.4% in 2004, despite a downturn in household consumption. Multiple reasons entailed a GDP growth of 6% in 2005. Headline consumer price inflation dropped from 26% in 1993 to an average rate of 7.5% in 2004, though this was boosted by hikes in subsidized utilities prices ahead of Slovakia's accession to the European Union. In July 2005, the inflation rate dropped to 2.0% and is projected at less than 3% in 2005 and 2.5% in 2006. In 2006, Slovakia reached the highest economic growth (8.9%) among the members of OECD and the third highest in the EU (just behind Estonia and Latvia). The country has had difficulties addressing regional imbalances in wealth and employment. GDP per capita ranges from 188% of EU average in Bratislava to only 54% in Eastern Slovakia.

About 10% of the Slovak labour force is expatriate in 2014. The country has one of the highest levels of long-term unemployment in Europe, with 7.1% of the labour force unemployed for more than a year in 2017.

99.9% of Slovak firms are small and medium-sized enterprises and they account for 73.3% of all jobs in the country.

== Sectors ==
=== Industry ===
Slovakia became industrialized mostly in the second half of the 20th century. Heavy industry (including coal mining and the production of machinery and steel) was built for strategic reasons because Slovakia was less exposed to military threats than the western parts of Czechoslovakia. After the end of the Cold War, the importance of industry, and especially of heavy industry, declined. In 2010, industry (including construction) accounted for 35.6% of GDP, compared with 49% in 1990. Nowadays, building on a long-standing tradition and a highly skilled labor force, main industries with potential of growth are following sectors: Automotive, Electronics, Mechanical engineering, Chemical engineering, Information technology.

The automotive sector is among the fastest growing sectors in Slovakia due to the recent large investments of Volkswagen (Bratislava), Peugeot (Trnava), Kia (Žilina) and since 2018 also Jaguar Land Rover in Nitra. Passenger car production was 1,040,000 units in 2016, what makes Slovakia the largest automobile producer in produced cars per capita. Other big industrial companies include U.S. Steel (metallurgy), Slovnaft (oil industry), Samsung Electronics (electronics), Foxconn (electronics), Mondi SCP (paper), Slovalco (aluminum production), Hyundai Mobis (automotive), Continental Matador (automotive) and Whirlpool Corporation. In 2006, machinery accounted for more than a half of Slovakia's export.

Largest companies by revenue (2024)

Company	Revenue (EUR millions)
Volkswagen Slovakia	12,520
Kia Motors Slovakia	8,077
Slovnaft	5,554
Všeobecná zdravotná poisťovňa	5,040
Slovenské elektrárne	3,726
Slovenský plynárenský priemysel	2,768
U. S. Steel Košice	2,684
DÔVERA zdravotná poisťovňa	2,398
Lidl Slovenská republika	2,156
Stellantis Slovakia	2,028

Largest companies by profit (2024)

Company	Profit (EUR millions)
Slovenské elektrárne	815
Kia Motors Slovakia	682
Slovnaft	365
SPP Infrastructure	342
Západoslovenská energetika	317
Volkswagen Slovakia	288
Slovenská sporiteľňa	283
Slovenský plynárenský priemysel	279
Všeobecná úverová banka	251
Tatra banka	216

=== Services ===
Slovak service sector grew rapidly during the last 10 years and now employs about 69% of the population and contributes with over 61% to GDP. Slovakia's tourism has been rising in recent years, income has doubled from US$640 million in 2001 to US$1.2 billion in 2005.

=== Information technology ===
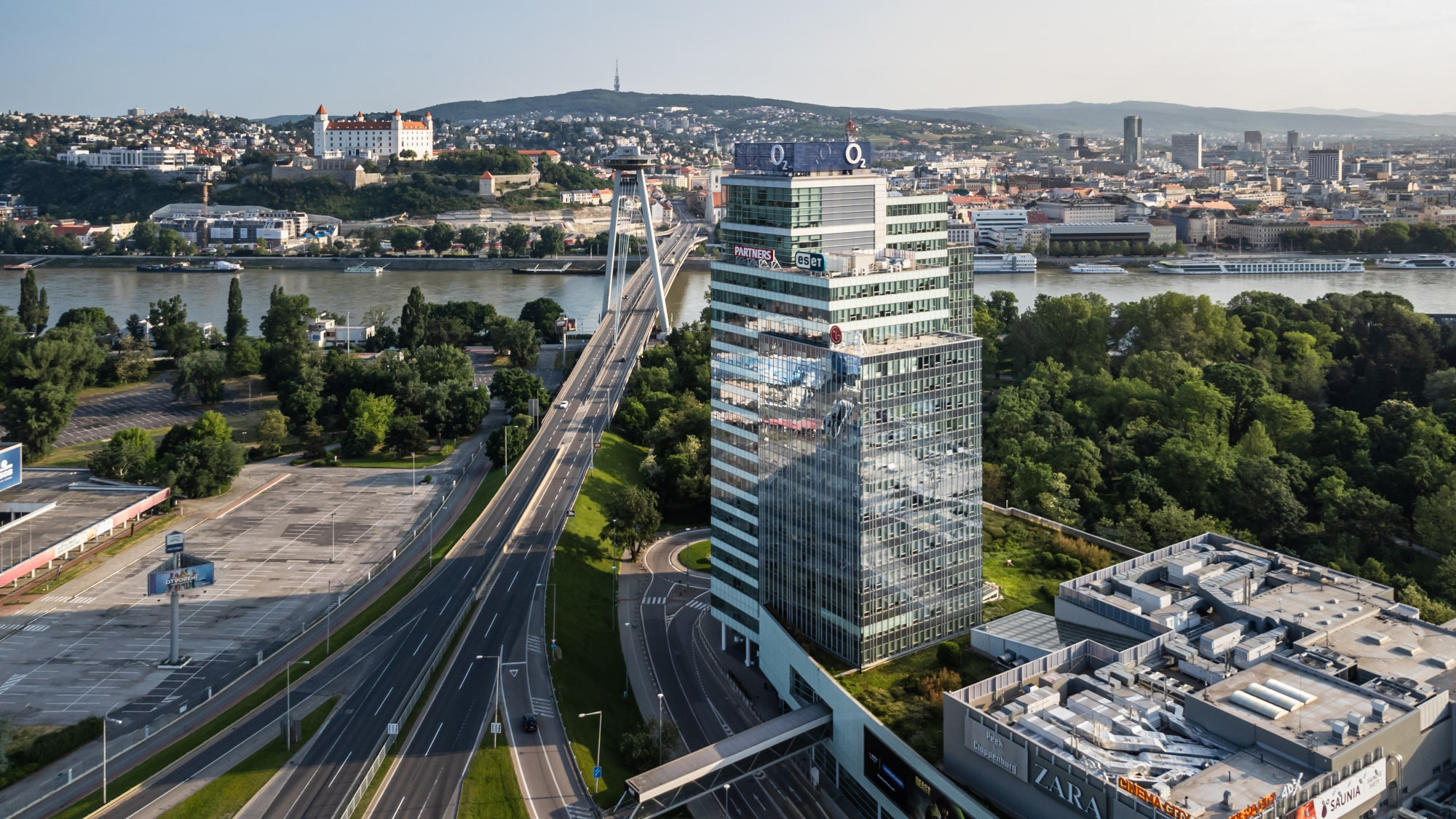
Headquarters of Eset

In recent years, service and high-tech-oriented businesses have prospered in Slovakia. Many global companies, including IBM, Dell, Lenovo, AT&T, SAP, Amazon, Johnson Controls, Swiss Re and Accenture, have built outsourcing and service centres in Bratislava and Košice (T-Systems, Cisco Systems, Ness, Deloitte). Slovak IT companies, including ESET, Sygic and Pixel Federation have headquarters in Bratislava.

=== Agriculture ===
In 2016, agriculture accounted for 3.6% of GDP (compared to 6.9% in 1993) and occupied about 3.9% of the labor force (down from 10.2% in 1994). Over 40% of the land in Slovakia is cultivated. The southern part of Slovakia (bordering with Hungary) is known for its rich farmland. Growing wheat, rye, corn, potatoes, sugar beets, grains, fruits and sunflowers. Vineyards are concentrated in Little Carpathians, Tokaj, and other southern regions. The breeding of livestock, including pigs, cattle, sheep, and poultry is also important.

Slovakia produced in 2018:

- 1.9 million tons of wheat;
- 1.5 million tons of maize;
- 1.3 million tons of sugar beet (the beet is used to manufacture sugar and ethanol);
- 486 thousand tons of barley;
- 480 thousand tons of rapeseed;
- 201 thousand tons of sunflower seed;
- 169 thousand tons of potato;
- 104 thousand tons of soybean;

In addition to smaller productions of other agricultural products, like grape (52 thousand tons).

== Innovation ==
According to a recent report by the European Commission, Slovakia (along with some other Central and Eastern European economies) is low on the list of EU states in terms of innovation (Slovakia ranks 22nd). Within the EU, it ranks next to last on knowledge creation and last for innovation and entrepreneurship. In the process of transition to a knowledge economy, it particularly lacks investment into education and a broader application of IT. The World Bank urges Slovakia to upgrade information infrastructure and reform the education system. The OECD states that a stronger product market competition would help.

In March 2006, the Slovak government introduced new measures to implement the Action Plan for R&D and Innovation. The program covers the period from 2006 to 2010. The RDA is expected to launch at least one call for the expression of interests related to this program each year. The annual budget for the program will be set by the RDA. The overall amount available for the program depends on annual national budget resources and is likely to vary from year to year. Following an increase of around 50% in budget resources, the RDA disposes of a total budget of €19.31 million in 2006.

== Labour ==
The minimum wage in Slovakia in 2026 is set at €915 per month, the average salary for 2024 was €1,524 per month, in the Bratislava region in 2025 the surveyed average salary was €2,379 per month. As of December 2025 the unemployment rate stood at 4.09%.

== International trade ==
Exports of Slovakia by product category (2019) Chemical products Transportation Machines Mineral products Plastics and rubbers Metals Foodstuffs Precious metals Textiles Instruments Animal products Vegetable products Paper goods Footwear and headwear Miscellaneous Stone and glass Wood products Animal and vegetable bi-products Animal hides Arts and antiques Weapons

Slovakia has an export-oriented economy, with the automotive industry playing a major role in its foreign trade. The country's principal merchandise exports include passenger cars, automotive components, electrical equipment, telecommunications equipment and television receivers. In 2023, merchandise exports totalled US$117.3 billion. Germany, the Czech Republic, Poland, Hungary and France were the largest export markets.

Merchandise imports amounted to US$115.4 billion in 2023. The largest imported products were telecommunications transmission equipment, parts and accessories of motor-vehicle bodies, natural gas, crude petroleum and transmissions for motor vehicles. Germany, the Czech Republic, China and Poland were the largest import partners.

== Foreign investments ==
Foreign direct investment (FDI) in Slovakia has increased dramatically. Cheap and skilled labor, a 19% flat tax rate for both businesses and individuals, no dividend taxes, a weak labor code, and a favorable geographical location are Slovakia's main advantages for foreign investors. FDI inflow grew more than 600% from 2000 and cumulatively reached an all-time high of, US$17.3 billion in 2006, or around $18,000 per capita by the end of 2006. The total inflow of FDI in 2006 was $2.54 billion. In October 2005 new investment stimuli introduced – more favorable conditions to IT and research centers, especially to be located in the east part of the country (where there is more unemployment), to bring more added value and not to be logistically demanding.

Origin of foreign investment 1996–2005 – the Netherlands 24.3%; Germany 19.4%, Austria 14.1%; Italy 7.5%, United States (8th largest investor) 4.0%. Top investors by companies: Deutsche Telekom (Germany), Neusiedler (Austria), Gaz de France (France), Gazprom (Russia), U.S.Steel (U.S.), MOL (Hungary), ENEL (Italy), E.ON (Germany).

Foreign investment sectors – industry 38.4%; banking and insurance 22.2%; wholesale and retail trade 13.1%; production of electricity, gas and water 10.5%; transport and telecommunications 9.2%.

Foreign direct investment "on green field" (US$millions)
	2003	2004	2005
Inflows	756	1,261	1,908
Outflows	22	144	146

Former minister (1998–2002) Brigita Schmögnerová explains that: "There is still a consensus among leaders on social dumping. Since the enlargement of the European Union, foreign companies have been looking for the cheapest labour, but instead of joining forces, governments in the region compete to offer the lowest possible level of taxes. When Slovakia joined the European Union in 2004, it became the first OECD country to introduce a full flat tax rate of 19% on both corporate profits and income or consumer goods. The lack of tax progressivity leads to a sharp increase in inequality. Spending on health, education or housing is below the EU average.

== Statistics ==
GDP growth The development of Slovakia's GDP according to the World Bank:

Year	2001	2002	2003	2004	2005	2006	2007	2008	2009	2010	2011	2012	2013	2014	2015	2016	2017	2018	2019	2020	2021	2022	2023
% GDP	3.3	4.5	5.5	5.3	6.6	8.5	10.8	5.6	−5.5	6.7	2.7	1.3	0.6	2.7	5.2	1.9	2.9	4.0	2.5	−3.3	4.8	1.9	1.6

Currency switch to the euro

Slovakia switched its currency from the Slovak crown (SK – slovenská koruna) to the Euro on 1 January 2009, at a rate of 30.1260 korunas to the euro.

Foreign trade

Year	2008	2009	2010	2011	2012	2013	2014	2015	2016	2017	2018	2019	2020
Exports € bn	49.5	39.7	35.0	56.8	62.8	64.4	64.8	73.12	74.35	83.9	93.1	91.2	86.4
Imports € bn	50.3	38.8	34.6	55.8	59.2	60.1	60.2	71.09	71.47	75.2	83.9	83.5	77.8

== Companies ==
In December 2025, the sector with the highest number of companies registered in Slovakia is Services with 254,314 companies followed by Construction, and Retail Trade with 47,705 and 44,198 companies respectively.

== See also ==
- Tatra Tiger
- List of Slovak regions by GDP
- List of Slovak companies
- Economy of Europe
