= Trebišov Aloud =

Trebišov Aloud Trebišov Nahlas
- Leader: Marián Kolesár
- Founder: Marián Kolesár
- Founded: 4 August 2014
- Dissolved: 10 February 2022
- Headquarters: Parková 3366/8, Trebišov
- Membership (2020): 33 (▼1)
- Ideology: Localism
- National Council: 0 / 150
- Municipal Assembly of Trebišov: 5 / 24

Website
- www.trebisovnahlas.sk

Trebišov Aloud (Slovak: Trebišov Nahlas) was a local political party in Slovakia, active mostly in the city of Trebišov. Marián Kolesár was the founder and the leader of the party

== History ==
The party was preceded by a non-governmental organisation of the same name, established in 2007, with the aim of stopping the planned construction of a coal electric power plant in the city of Trebišov. It transformed into a political party in 2014 and dissolved in 2022.

== Electoral results ==
=== Municipal Assembly of Trebišov ===
Election	Votes	%	Seats	+/–
2010	-	-	8 / 25	-
2014	12,907	54.2	13 / 24	▲5
2018	4,819	20.8	5 / 24	▼8

=== Municipal Assembly of Trebišov ===
Election	Candidate	Votes	%	+/–	Result
2010	Marián Kolesár	2,608	31.12	-	Mayor
2014	Marián Kolesár	3,998	49.66	▲18.54%	Lost
2018	Marián Kolesár	3,941	31.82	▼17.84%	Lost
