= UniCredit Bank Slovakia =

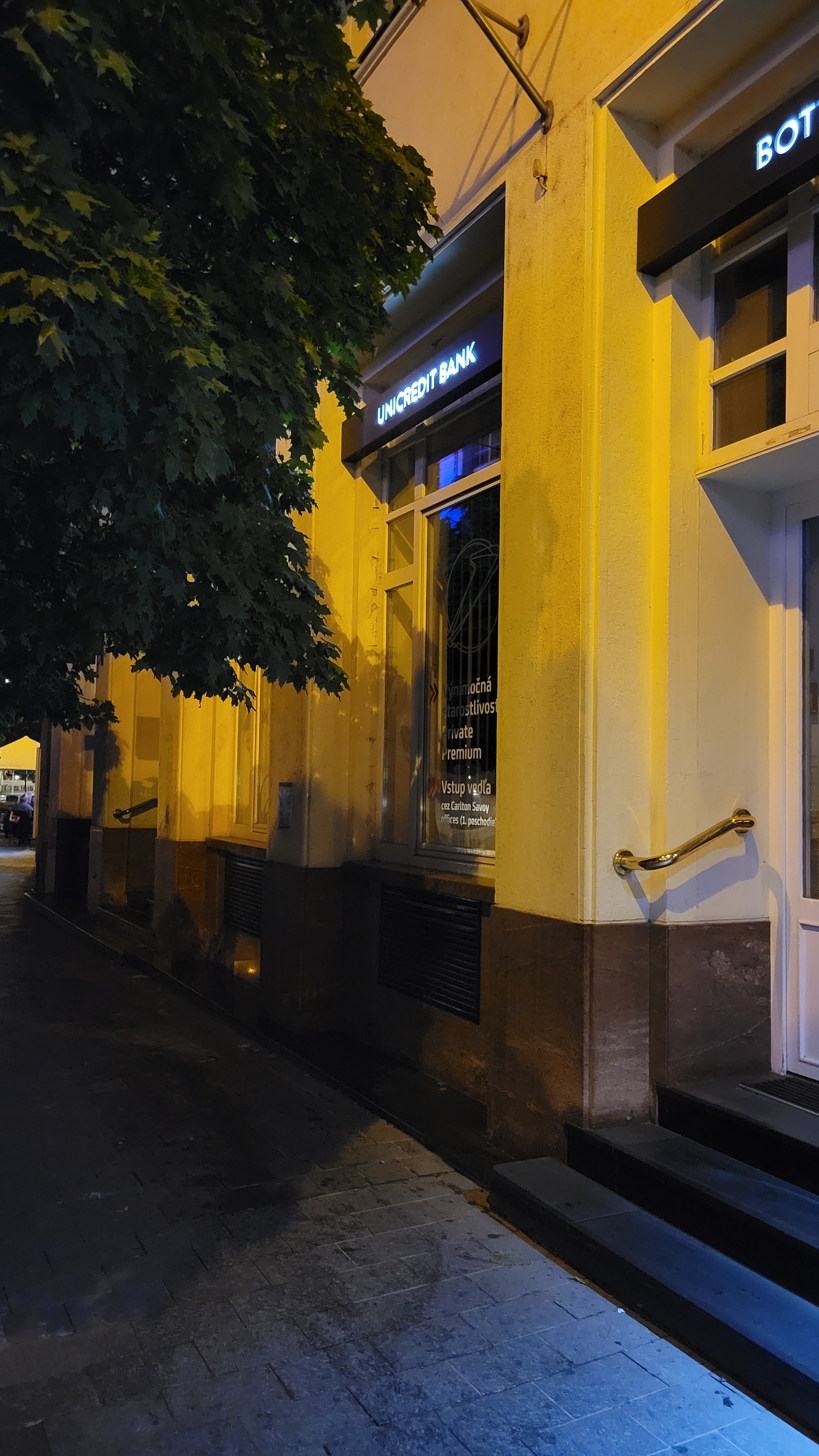
UniCredit Bank Slovakia

UniCredit Bank Slovakia was a Slovak bank, formed by the merger of HVB Bank Slovakia and UniBanka in 2007, both owned by Italy-based UniCredit Group. In 2013 it was absorbed by UniCredit Bank Czech Republic, forming UniCredit Bank Czech Republic and Slovakia.

== Predecessors ==
=== UniBanka ===
UniBanka, formerly known as Poľnobanka, was a Slovak bank headquartered in Bratislava. An additional 51% shares was acquired from Slovenska Poistovna in May 2000 by UniCredit. European Bank for Reconstruction and Development was a minority shareholder of the bank, for 20% stake. Before the acquisition, UniCredit (at that time known as Unicredito Italiano) already owned 5.43% shares, which was previously owned by Unicredito. Poľnobanka was renamed UniBanka on 1 April 2002.

=== HVB Bank Slovakia ===
==== Bank Austria Creditanstalt Slovakia ====
Austrian bank Creditanstalt Bankverein opened their first branch in Bratislava in 1990. Bank Austria entered the Slovak market in 1994. Following the acquisition of Creditanstalt Bankverein by Bank Austria in 1999, the bank became known as Bank Austria Creditanstalt Slovakia.

==== HypoVereinsbank Slovakia ====
Hypo-Bank Slovakia was established in July 1996, beneath its parent company, Bayerische Hypotheken- und Wechsel-Bank. After the parent company was merged with Bayerische Vereinsbank, the Slovak bank took on the name HypoVereinsbank Slovakia in November 1998. The parent company became part of the Bank Austria group in December 2000.

==== Merged bank ====
Bank Austria Creditanstalt Slovakia merged with HypoVereinsbank Slovakia on 30 September 2001 to establish HVB Bank Slovakia, 100% owned by Bank Austria Creditanstalt.

== See also ==
- List of banks in Slovakia
