= UniCredit Bank Czech Republic and Slovakia =

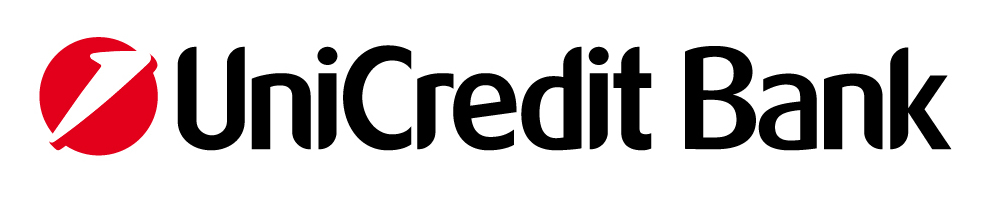
- Company type: Subsidiary
- Industry: Financial services
- Predecessor: Živnostenská banka; UniCredit Bank Czech Republic; UniCredit Bank Slovakia
- Founded: 1 October 2006 (first merger); 1 December 2013 (second merger)
- Headquarters: 1525/1 Želetavská, Prague, Czech Republic
- Area served: Czech Republic and Slovakia
- Services: Retail, corporate & investment banking; finance leasing
- Revenue: 16,576,000,000 Czech koruna (2021)
- Net income: ▲CZK5.640 billion (2015)
- Total assets: ▲CZK570.284 billion (2015)
- Total equity: ▲CZK61.506 billion (2015)
- Owner: UniCredit S.p.A. (99.96%)
- Number of employees: (December 2015)
- Capital ratio: 14.17% (Group CET1 ratio)
- Website: www.unicreditbank.cz
- Footnotes / references in a consolidated basis (including minority interests); in IFRS

UniCredit Bank Czech Republic and Slovakia a.s., is a Czech and Slovak bank based in Prague, the capital of the Czech Republic. The bank was a subsidiary of Italy-based UniCredit Group for 99.96% stake.

== History ==
UniCredit Bank Czech Republic and Slovakia a.s. was founded on 1 December 2013 by UniCredit Bank Czech Republic a.s. absorbed Slovak sister company UniCredit Bank Slovakia a.s. UniCredit Bank Czech Republic itself was founded on 1 October 2006 by the merger of HVB Bank Czech Republic a.s. and Živnostenská banka a.s.

The parent company of HVB Bank Czech Republic, German bank HypoVereinsbank (HVB) was acquired by UniCredit Group in 2005. HypoVereinsbank's subsidiary, Bank Austria (aka UniCredit Bank Austria), was the direct parent company of UniCredit Bank Czech Republic and Slovakia until September 2016. In September 2016 UniCredit S.p.A., the ultimate parent company, acquired the whole Central and Eastern Europe division from subsidiary Bank Austria.

== See also ==
- List of banks in the Czech Republic
- List of banks in Slovakia
