= Slovak Guarantee and Development Bank =

Slovenská záručná a rozvojová banka, a.s.
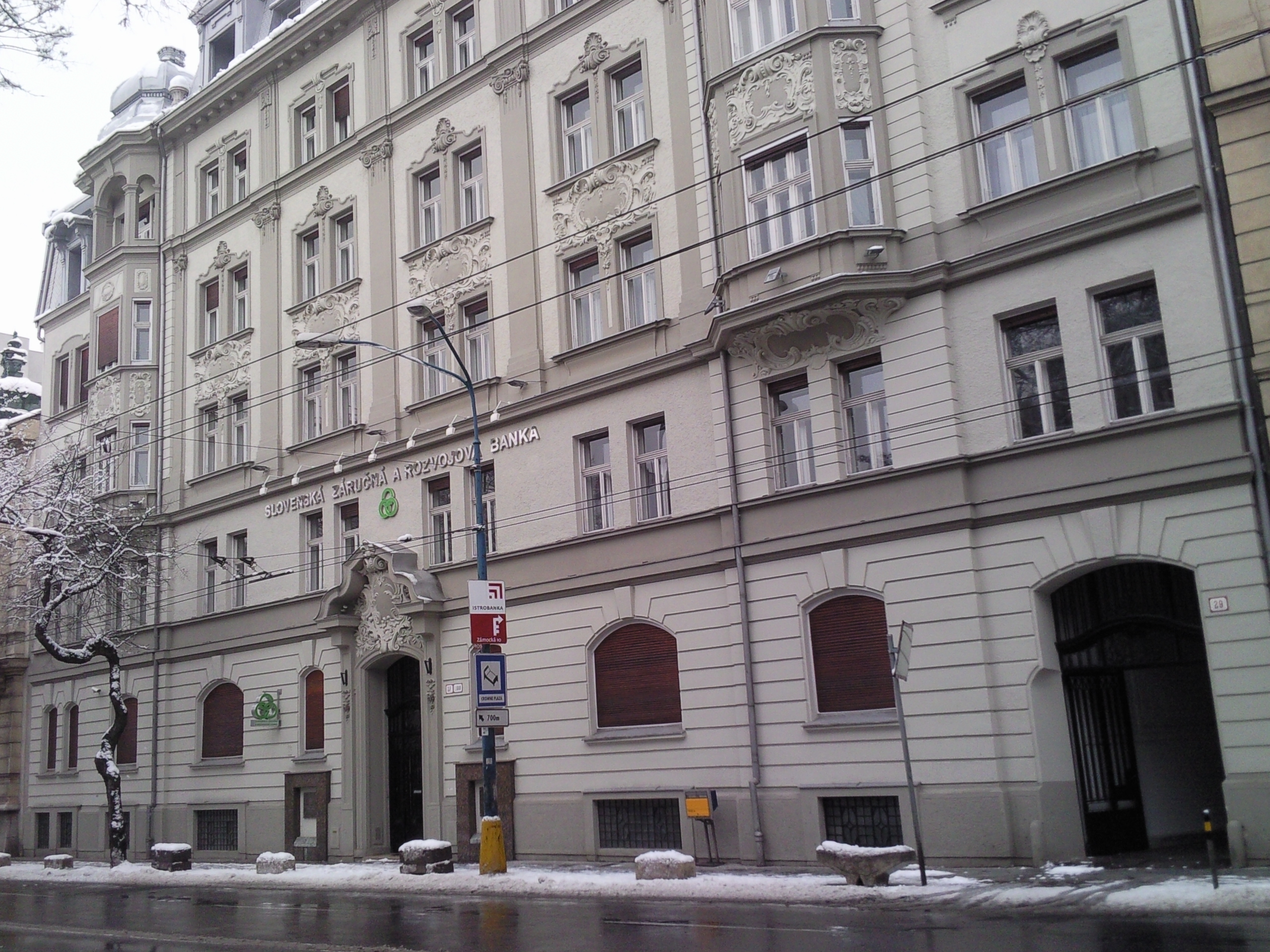
- Slovenská záručná a rozvojová banka headquarters in Bratislava
- Company type: Public
- Industry: Financial services
- Founded: 1991
- Headquarters: Bratislava, Slovakia
- Key people: Ing. Dušan Tomašec (CEO)
- Products: Banking, establishment and development support
- Revenue: NA
- Number of employees: 165

Slovenská záručná a rozvojová banka (Slovak Guarantee and Development Bank) is a specialised banking institution in Slovakia founded by the central body of state administration – the Ministry of Finance of the Slovak Republic. The bank has become the first bank in Eastern Europe to focus on the support of small and medium-sized enterprises. It started its activities in September 1991. Currently, the bank has 9 regional branches.

== Headquarters ==
- Štefánikova 27, 814 99 Bratislava, Slovakia

== See also ==
- List of national development banks
- List of banks in Slovakia
