= OFZ, a.s., Istebné =

- Company type: Private company
- Industry: Metallurgy
- Founded: 1954 (Istebné, Slovakia)
- Headquarters: Istebné, Slovakia
- Products: ferroalloys, wires, construction materials
- Revenue: € 119 million (2014)
- Net income: € 2.3 million (2014)
- Number of employees: 453 (2014)
- Website: www.ofz.sk

OFZ, a.s., Istebné, headquartered in Istebné, in Orava region in Slovakia, is Slovakia’s largest ferroalloy manufacturer. OFZ stands for Oravské Ferozliatinové Závody (Orava Ferroalloy Industries). Company is one of the most important Slovak companies producing base metal products. Among the main products of OFZ are ferrosilicon and ferromanganese ferroalloys, cored wires, and silicate construction materials derived from slag from the production of alloys. In 2014, the company produced 91 thousand tons of ferroalloys as well as 9 thousand tons of cored wires. Sales added up to EUR 119 million and net income came to EUR 2.3 million. Most of the products are exported to Central European countries.

== History ==
History of ferroalloy production in Orava region in Slovakia begins in 1952, when the company Kovohuty Istebné was founded, with main production programme being the production of ferroalloys in electric arc furnaces.

In 1954, new ferromanganese factory was opened in Istebné (part of Orava). After 1989, the company was privatised, eventually leading to its transformation to OFZ, a.s., Istebné.

The old factory in Istebné was closed in 2003, and all of the production capacities were moved to Široká.
