= List of banks in Slovakia =

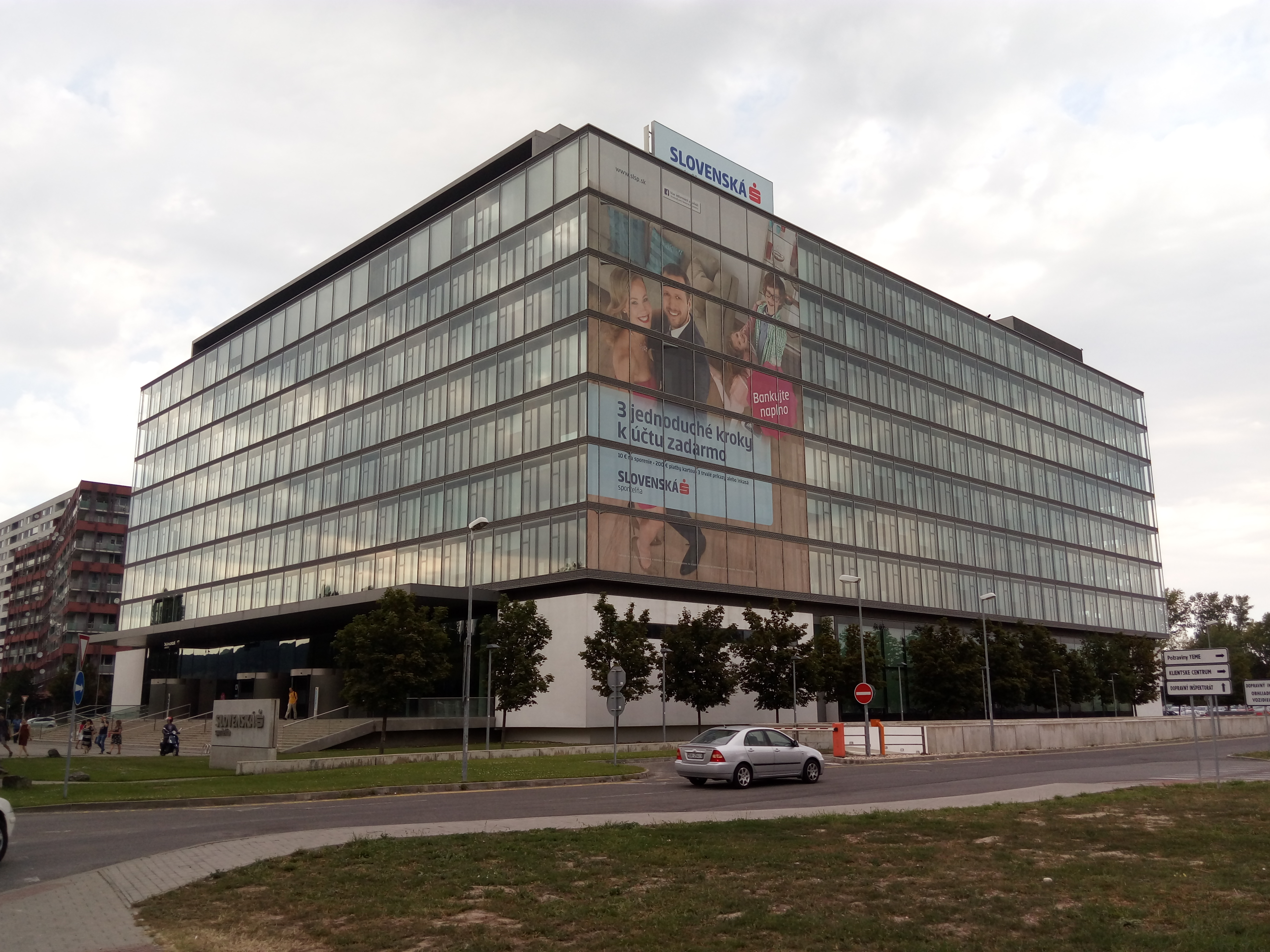
Slovenská Sporiteľňa head office, Bratislava

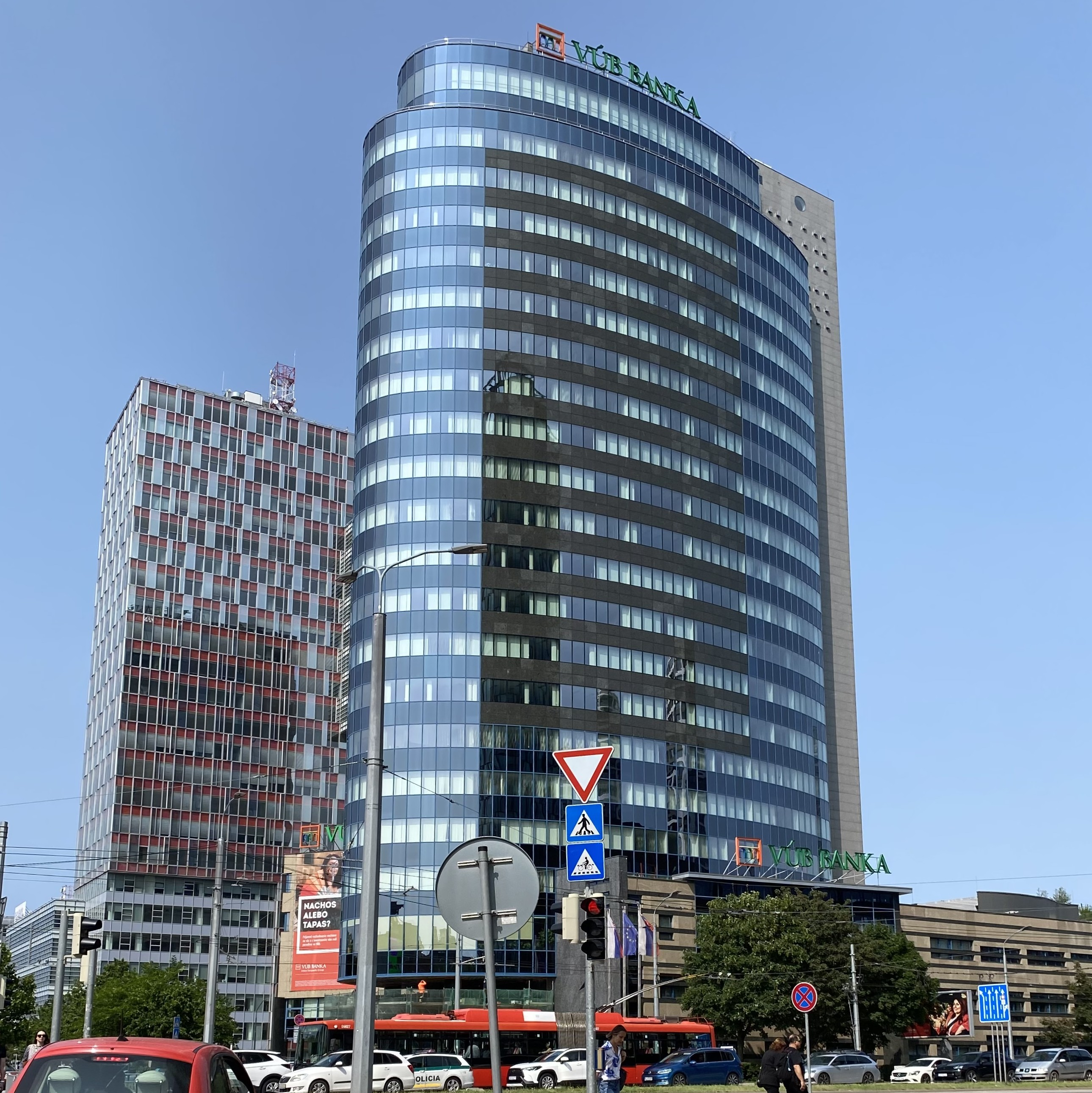
VÚB head office, Bratislava

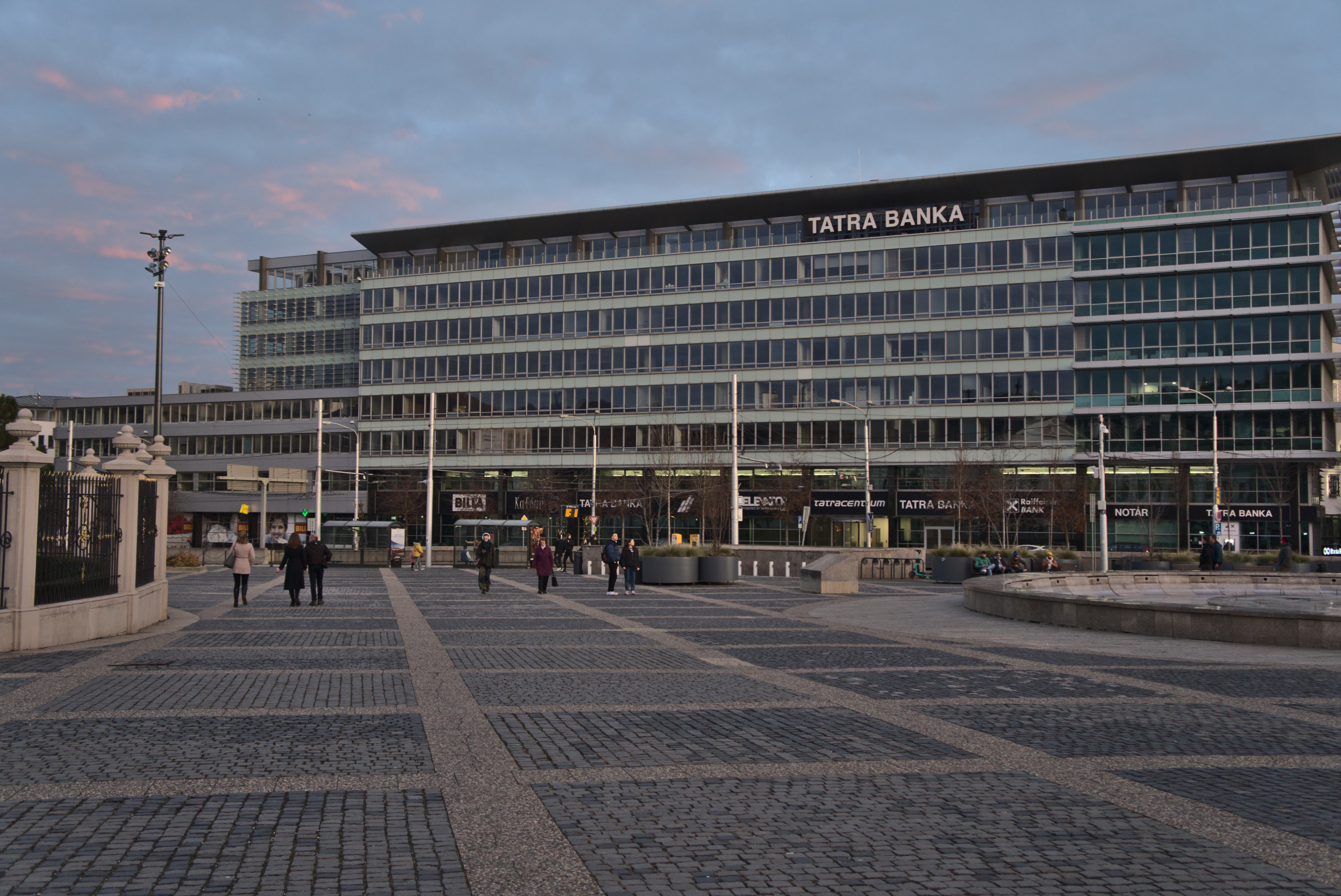
Tatra Banka head office, Bratislava

The following list of banks in Slovakia is to be understood within the framework of the European single market and European banking union, which means that Slovakia's banking system is more open to cross-border banking operations than peers outside of the EU.

== Policy framework ==
European banking supervision distinguishes between significant institutions (SIs) and less significant institutions (LSIs), with SI/LSI designations updated regularly by the European Central Bank (ECB). Significant institutions are directly supervised by the ECB using joint supervisory teams that involve the national competent authorities (NCAs) of individual participating countries. Less significant institutions are supervised by the relevant NCA on a day-to-day basis, under the supervisory oversight of the ECB. In Slovakia's case, the NCA is the National Bank of Slovakia.

== Significant institutions ==
As of 1 September 2025, the list of supervised institutions maintained by the ECB included no Slovak banking groups as SIs. Instead, banking groups based in other euro-area countries have significant operations in the country. A study published in 2024 assessed that the largest banking group by assets in Slovakia (as opposed to total consolidated assets) at end-2023 were:

- Erste Group (€26 billion), via Slovenská Sporiteľňa
- Intesa Sanpaolo (€24 billion), via Všeobecná Úverová Banka
- Raiffeisen Bank International (€22 billion), via Tatra Banka and Raiffeisenbank Slovakia
- KBC (€15 billion), via ČSOB and 365.bank as

Other euro-area banks that operate in Slovakia include:

- Commerzbank, via mBank Slovakia
- Société Générale, via Komerční Banka Bratislava
- UniCredit, via UniCredit Bank Czech Republic and Slovakia

Crédit Mutuel (via Cofidis) and ING are also present via branches.

== Less significant institutions ==
As of 1 September 2025, the ECB's list of supervised institutions included nine Slovak LSIs.

=== High-impact LSIs ===
Of these, the following two were designated by the ECB as "high-impact" on the basis of several criteria including size:

- Prima Banka Slovensko as, majority-owned by Penta Investments
- Prvá Stavebná Sporiteľňa as

=== Other Slovak LSIs ===
The remaining three domestic LSIs were:

- Privatbanka as, known as Banka Slovakia until 2005, majority-owned by Penta Investments
- Slovenská Záručná a Rozvojová Banka as, a public development bank
- Wüstenrot Stavebná Sporiteľňa as, subsidiary of Wüstenrot-Gruppe

=== Non-euro-area-controlled LSIs ===
Three other Slovak LSIs were branches of financial groups based outside of the euro area:

- (Czech Republic) Slovak branch of Fio Banka
- (Czech Republic) Slovak branch of J&T Banka
- (Poland) Slovak branch of PKO BP SA

As of October 2025, there were no branches of banks located outside the European Economic Area ("third-country branches" in EU parlance) in Slovakia, based on data compiled by the European Banking Authority.

== Other institutions ==
The National Bank of Slovakia and EXIMBANKA SR are public-sector credit institutions that do not hold a banking license under EU law.

== Defunct banks ==
A few former Slovak banks, defined as having been headquartered in the present-day territory of Slovakia, are documented on Wikipedia. They are listed below in chronological order of establishment.

- Tatra Banka (1884–1948)
- Slovak National Bank (1939–1945)
- Sberbank Slovakia (1991–2017), which had absorbed Ľudová / Volksbank cooperative banks
- Istrobanka (1992–2009)
- HVB Bank Slovakia (1994–2007), integrating the successive Slovenská Poľnohospodárska Banka (1994–1996), Poľnobanka (1996–2002), and UniBanka (2002–2007)
- OTP Bank Slovakia (2002–2020)
- UniCredit Bank Slovakia (2007–2013)
- ZUNO Bank (2010–2017)

Additional banks that left the Slovak market included, by chronological order of exit:

- AG Banka, failed in 1999
- Priemyselná Banka, merged with Slovenská sporiteľňa in 1999
- Dopravná Banka, failed in 2000
- Slovenská Kreditná Banka, failed in 2000
- Devín Banka, failed in 2001
- Investičná a Rozvojová Banka, purchased by OTP in 2002
- Prvá Komunálna Banka, purchased by Dexia in 2003
- The Slovak operation of HSBC, ended in 2012
- Dexia Slovakia, subsidiary of Dexia (2003–2012)
- Branch of Axa Bank Europe (subsidiary of Axa), left in 2013
- Branch of Royal Bank of Scotland, left in 2015
- Branch of Cetelem (subsidiary of BNP Paribas), left in 2023
- Branch of KDB Bank Europe, subsidiary of Korea Development Bank, left in 2024

== See also ==
- List of banks in the euro area
- List of banks in Europe
