= Webglobe =

Web hosting company

- Type: Joint-stock company
- Industry: Web hosting
- Founded: 1999 in Slovakia
- Founders: Igor Strečko, Juraj Hanták
- Headquarters: Bratislava, Slovakia
- Area served: Slovakia, Czech Republic, Serbia
- Key people: Giacomo Tognoni (CEO)
- Parent: group.one
- Website: webglobe.com

Webglobe is a web hosting provider and domain registrar operating in Slovakia, the Czech Republic and Serbia. Founded in Slovakia in 1999, it became the second largest hosting provider in the Slovak market and, through an acquisition programme conducted between 2019 and 2024, one of the largest providers in the Czech Republic. It has been owned by the Swedish digital services company group.one since May 2024.

The company is an accredited registrar for the .cz, .eu, .sk and .rs top-level domains and is a member of the registry organisations CZ.NIC, EURid, SK-NIC and RNIDS.

== History ==
=== Founding and early growth ===
Webglobe was founded in Bratislava in 1999 by Igor Strečko and Juraj Hanták, then students at the University of Economics in Bratislava. The business initially built websites before shifting to hosting them, later adding domain registration, virtual private servers, dedicated servers and cloud services.

In 2014 the company acquired its Slovak competitor Yegon. The merged business traded as Webglobe-Yegon, s.r.o. under the brand WY, and held a Slovak market share of roughly 10 percent, making it the second largest provider in the country.

=== Sandberg Capital ownership ===
In October 2019 the Slovak private equity firm Sandberg Capital, majority owned by the former J&T partner Martin Fedor, acquired a 75 per cent stake in Webglobe-Yegon. Strečko retained 15.5 per cent and Hanták 9.5 per cent, and both remained active in the business. The parties did not disclose the price, which Forbes Slovensko estimated at low single digit millions of euros. The company then reported annual revenue of EUR 1.8 million and employed over twenty people.

Sandberg Capital established the holding company WY Group as the vehicle for a regional acquisition strategy. In November 2019 the group acquired the Czech registrar IGNUM, owner of domena.cz, giving it entry to the Czech market. By mid-2020 WY Group combined Webglobe-Yegon and Atlantis Systems in Slovakia with IGNUM and Stable.cz in the Czech Republic. Strečko moved from chief executive of Webglobe-Yegon to lead WY Group, and Imrich Koller took over the Slovak business.

During 2020 IGNUM acquired the hosting provider Stable.cz and the hosting division of Axfone. In June 2021 the group acquired Savana.cz, which managed more than 50,000 domains, and in August 2021 ONEsolution, operator of the ONEbit hosting service, with more than 25,000 domains. By late 2021 Strečko said the company had invested more than 200 million Czech koruna in the Czech market and held twelve brands in its portfolio.

=== Serbian expansion and rebranding ===
In January 2022 the group entered the Serbian market by acquiring three local hosting providers, NiNet, Eutelnet and Panet. At the same time it consolidated its activities under the single Webglobe brand and retired the WY Group name. Lupa.cz reported group revenue for the previous year at 205 million koruna, with more than 350,000 domains under management and over 150,000 customers.

In the same year the Slovak entity was renamed Webglobe and converted into a joint-stock company, and the Czech entity IGNUM, s.r.o. was renamed Webglobe s.r.o.

In August 2023 Webglobe acquired the Brno based provider EBOLA Czech, known as eBola.cz, which Lupa.cz described as the company's eighteenth acquisition in four years and its tenth in the Czech Republic. By that point Strečko had become chairman of the board and Giacomo Tognoni, an Italian manager based in Slovakia, had taken over as chief executive.

== Market position ==
Reporting in December 2023, Lupa.cz placed Webglobe among the largest hosting providers in the Czech Republic alongside Forpsi, Active 24 and Wedos, in a market the publication estimated, from its own calculations and figures obtained from industry sources, at over one billion koruna annually. It noted that the Czech market had never been formally measured, and that its fragmentation among very small firms and sole traders had created the conditions for consolidation and the economies of scale that follow it. The publication recorded Webglobe's 2022 revenue at 216 million koruna, of which 155 million came from the Czech Republic, and reported that the company was targeting 230 million for 2023. It estimated the total cost of the Czech acquisitions at over 200 million koruna and characterized the strategy as assembling a regional operator for eventual sale to an international hosting group.

Lupa.cz later described this as a recurring pattern in the region: a consolidator combines smaller operators in a fragmented market and absorbs the integration work, after which a larger international buyer acquires the assembled group. It applied the same analysis to the parallel sale of Active 24 and WebSupport to the Belgian group Team Blue.

== Acquisition by group.one ==
In May 2024 group.one, a Swedish provider of hosting and digital services, acquired a 100 per cent stake in Webglobe from Strečko and a fund managed by Sandberg Capital. Neither party disclosed the price. Lupa.cz reported 2023 revenue of approximately EUR 10 million, around 250 million koruna, and estimated the valuation at five to six times revenue, implying a figure above one billion koruna, comparing that multiple to the market valuation of the American hosting company GoDaddy. The transaction was Sandberg Capital's second major exit, and Tognoni continued to lead the business.

The Slovak Spectator reported the transaction alongside the parallel sale of the Slovak market leader WebSupport, describing both as the passing of the Slovak hosting sector into foreign ownership. group.one is backed by the private equity firm Cinven and the Ontario Teachers' Pension Plan.

Forbes Slovensko and Denník N reported that at the time of the acquisition the group managed close to 300,000 registered domains for around 150,000 customers, amounting to roughly 10 per cent of national domains in each of Slovakia, the Czech Republic and Serbia. It employed around 100 people across offices in Prague, Bratislava and Belgrade.

Webglobe operates in Serbia through the subsidiary Webglobe d.o.o., based in Niš.

== Later developments ==
In December 2024 Webglobe acquired the Prague based provider C4 Webhosting, known locally as Český hosting, from its owners Jan Vítek and Jan Chyský. The parties did not disclose the price; C4 had reported revenue of 10.6 million koruna in 2022 with a narrow profit. The company retained its own brand during a transitional period before integration into Webglobe's infrastructure.

Webglobe provides domain registration, shared and WordPress hosting, email services, virtual and dedicated servers, SSL certificates and cloud infrastructure across its three markets.

Lupa.cz described Webglobe as one of the largest hosting providers in the Czech market alongside Forpsi, Active 24 and Wedos, in a market the publication estimated at over one billion koruna annually.

group.one is backed by the British private equity firm Cinven and the Ontario Teachers' Pension Plan. Webglobe operates in Serbia through the subsidiary Webglobe d.o.o., based in Niš.

In December 2024, group.one expanded Webglobe further in the Czech Republic by acquiring the Prague based provider C4 Webhosting, known locally as Český hosting. The company retained its own brand during a transitional period before integration, and its former owners remained in management.

In July 2026, virtualization software company Proxmox published a case study describing Webglobe's migration of its virtualization infrastructure from VMware to Proxmox Virtual Environment. According to Proxmox, the migration was carried out gradually by Webglobe's internal infrastructure teams and covered internal systems, customer virtual servers and hosting platforms across multiple countries and data centres. The company cited improved cost predictability, reduced vendor dependency and standardized operations as benefits of the transition, and said it planned to use Proxmox VE for new projects and the further expansion of existing clusters.
