= Šariš Brewery =

Brewery in Slovakia

Two glasses of 10% Šariš Slovak beer

Šariš Brewery (Slovak: Pivovar Šariš) is the largest brewery in Slovakia, located in Veľký Šariš near Prešov (Prešov Region). Since January 1, 2007, the company Pivovary Topvar has operated in Slovakia, which is the combination of the existing breweries Pivovar Šariš and Topvar. Šariš Brewery was sold to Asahi Breweries of Japan on December 13, 2016. Asahi Breweries owns 100% of the shares of Pivovary Topvar.

Šariš Brewery was founded in 1964. The first litres of Šariš beer were brewed on May 26, 1967. Between 1997 and 2017 the brewery was part of global brewing giant SABMiller.

== Products ==
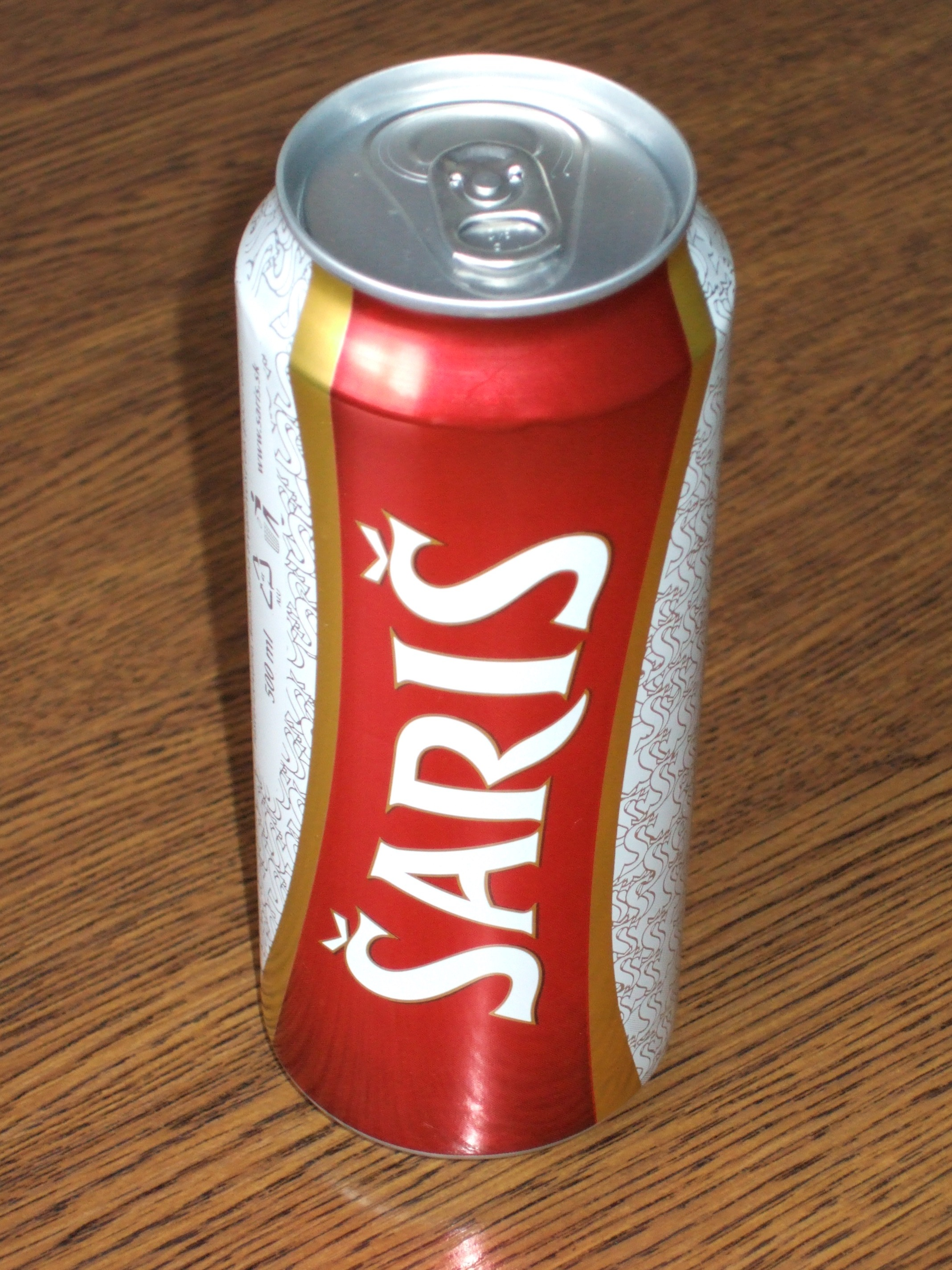
Šariš beer can

- Šariš 12% Premium – a premium beer produced from light malt by two-phase fermentation, with a subsequent long refermentation at low temperatures. This brand is the pride of the Šariš Brewery, awarded in the Monde Selection world quality contest in Brussels with three gold medals.
- Šariš 11% Tmavý – a dark beer, brewed from four kinds of malt and hops.
- Šariš 10% – Šariš Light was the first brand brewed by the Šariš Brewery in 1967, a draught table beer.
- Smädný mních (Thirsty Monk Light) – a light draught beer.

== Gallery ==
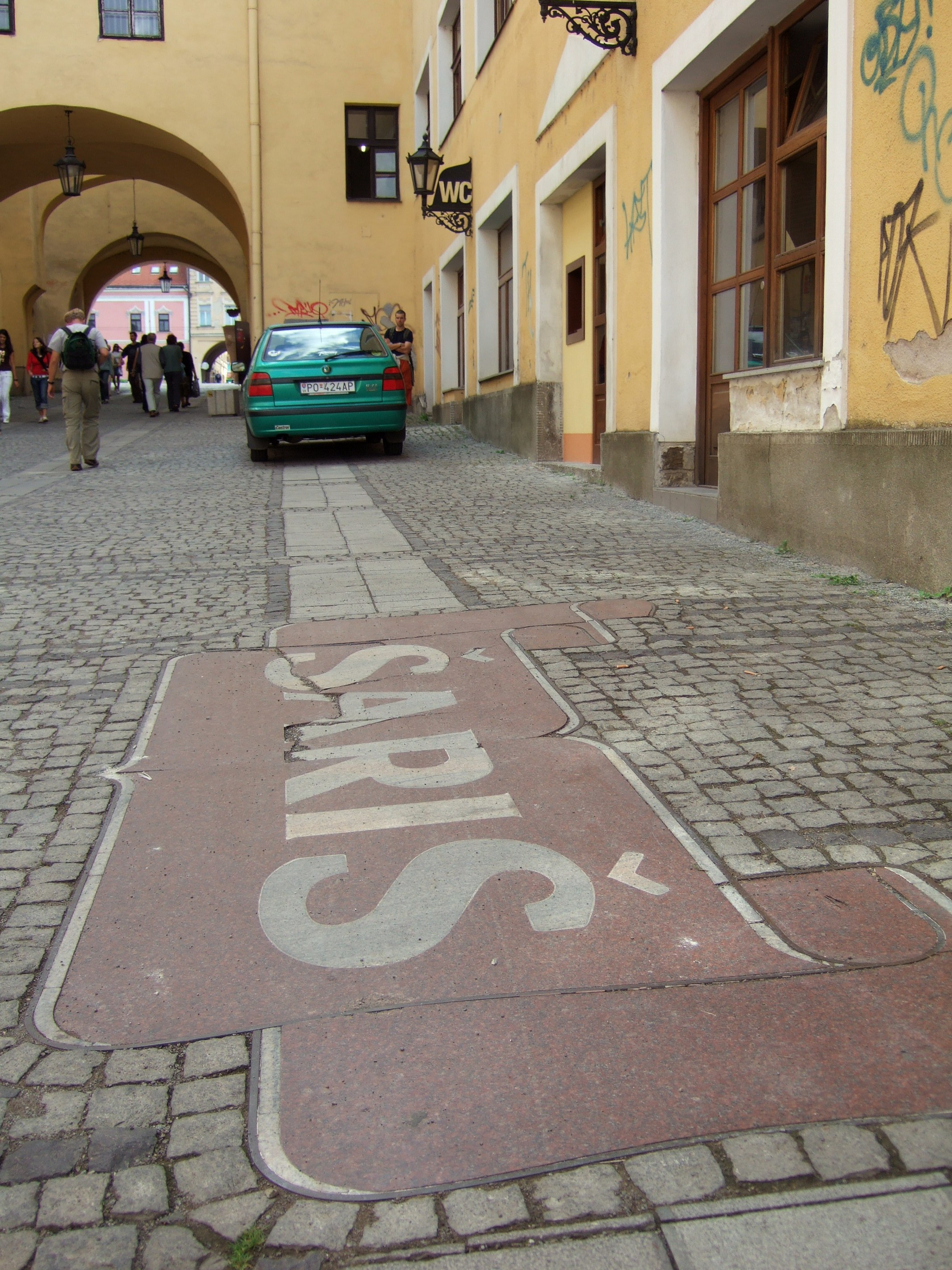
Šariš Brewery logo
on the sidewalk in Prešov
