= Komerční Banka Bratislava =

Komerční banka Bratislava, a.s.
- Type: Public
- Industry: Financial services
- Founded: 1995
- Headquarters: Bratislava, Slovakia,
- Key people: Ing. Jaromír Chabr (CEO) Ing. Vlastimil Czabe CEO
- Products: Banking, investment banking, asset management, leasing
- Revenue: € 13,5 million

Komerční banka Bratislava is a commercial bank operates in Slovakia. Its wholly owned subsidiary of Czech Komerční banka, a member of the Group Société Générale.

== History ==
Komerční banka Bratislava (herein KB Bratislava) has been operating in Slovakia since 1995 as a bank with a universal banking licence.

KB Bratislava was founded as part of the expansion of business and financial activities between the Czech Republic and Slovakia. For its competitive system of payments with the Czech Republic, KB Bratislava has acquired a position on the Slovak financial market. KB Bratislava conducts its business based on its banking licence and meets the criteria for all types of financial transactions, including capital market transactions under the supervision of the Financial Market Authority.

== Société Générale ==
The integration of Czech Komerční banka into the Société Générale Group in October 2001 made KB Bratislava, part of one of the largest financial groups in the world and third largest corporate and investment bank in the Eurozone. It employs 103,000 people worldwide, offers to 20 million clients worldwide.

- See also: Société Générale

== Shareholders ==
Czech Komerční banka is the 100% shareholder of Komerční banka Bratislava. Shareholder structure of Czech Komerční banka from September 2006 is:

- Société Générale (60.35%)
- Investors Bank & Trust (6.04%)
- The Bank of New York (2.92%)

Source: official site of Komerční banka Bratislava

== See also ==
- List of banks in Slovakia
