= Vagónka =

Vagónka is a Slovak railway coach and shipping containers maker and repairer. Its headquarters is in Trebisov.
