= SARIO =

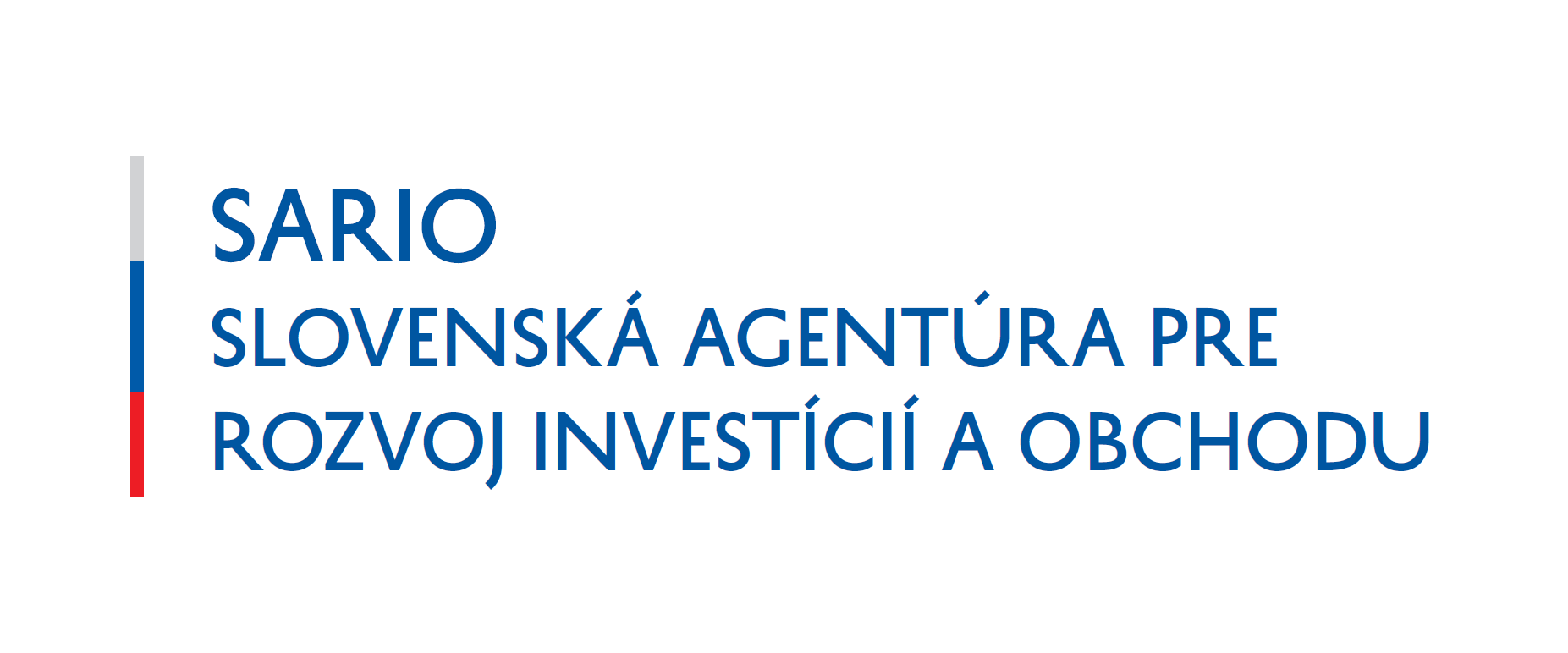
Logo SARIO

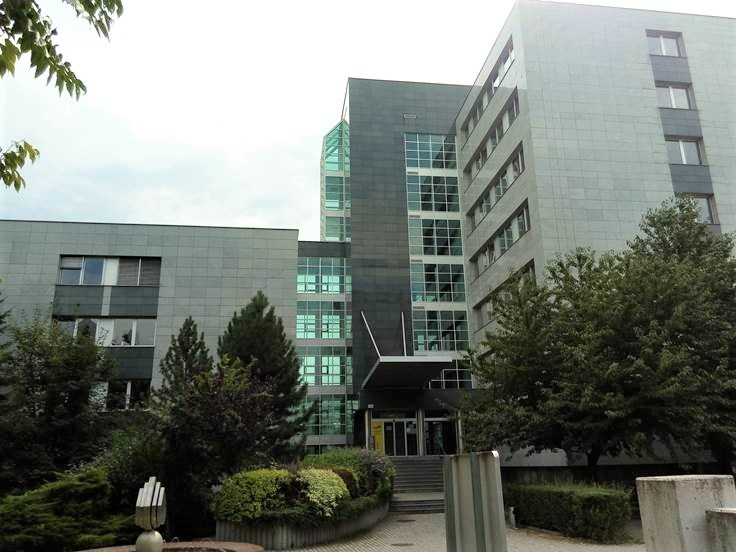
New seat of SARIO at Mlynské nivy 44/b, Bratislava

SARIO, Slovak Investment and Trade Development Agency (Slovenská agentúra pre rozvoj investícií a obchodu in Slovak) is a government agency established in the Slovak Republic in 2001, which works under the direction of the Ministry of Economy of the Slovak Republic.

SARIO operates internationally and domestically; its officials are regularly invited to attend professional forums to present and discuss issues of foreign direct investments and foreign trade. SARIO has a network of six regional offices in Slovakia and operates worldwide via 46 Commercial representatives of the Slovak Ministry of Economy.
