= List of Slovak regions by GDP =

This is a list of Slovak regions by GDP and GDP per capita.

== List of Regions by GDP ==
Regions by GDP in 2022 according to data by the OECD.

Rank	Region	GDP in mil EUR	GDP in mil USD (PPP)
1	Bratislava Region	30,709	62,394
2	Košice Region	13,289	27,001
3	Žilina Region	12,396	25,186
4	Trnava Region	12,102	24,588
5	Nitra Region	11,242	22,840
6	Trenčín Region	10,020	20,359
7	Prešov Region	9,995	20,307
8	Banská Bystrica Region	9,892	20,099
	Slovakia	109,645	222,774

== List of Regions by GDP per capita ==
Regions by GDP per capita in 2022 according to data by the OECD.

Rank	Region	GDP per capita in EUR	GDP per capita in USD (PPP)
1	Bratislava Region	42,297	85,937
2	Trnava Region	21,403	43,486
3	Žilina Region	17,996	36,564
4	Trenčín Region	17,512	35,581
5	Košice Region	17,040	34,621
6	Nitra Region	16,726	33,983
7	Banská Bystrica Region	15,971	32,450
8	Prešov Region	12,372	25,136
	Slovakia	20,207	41,057
