= Trebišov =

Trebišov Tőketerebes
- Municipality
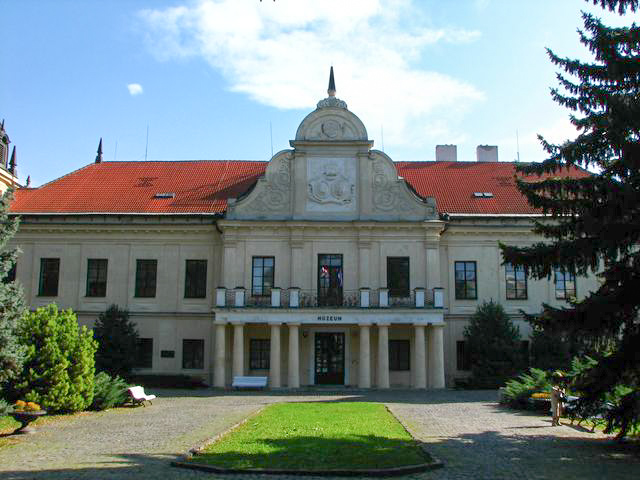
- A museum in Trebišov

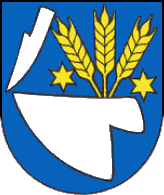
- Flag Coat of arms

- Location of Trebišov in the Košice Region Location of Trebišov in Slovakia
- Coordinates: 48.63°N 21.72°E
- Country: Slovakia
- Region: Košice Region
- District: Trebišov District
- First mentioned: 1254

Government
  - Mayor: Marek Čižmár

Area
  - Total: 70.15 km^{2} (27.09 sq mi)
- Elevation: 104 m (341 ft)

Population (2025)
  - Total: 22,706
- Time zone: UTC+1 (CET)
  - Summer (DST): UTC+2 (CEST)
- Postal code: 750 1
- Area code: +421 56
- Vehicle registration plate (until 2022): TV
- Website: www.trebisov.sk

Trebišov (Hungarian: Tőketerebes; German: Trebischau; Ukrainian: Требишів) is a small industrial town in the easternmost part of Slovakia, with a population of around 25,000. The town is an administrative, economic and cultural center with machine (Vagónka) and building materials industries.

Historical population
Year	Pop.	±%
1970	11,788	—
1980	15,621	+32.5%
1991	20,675	+32.4%
2001	22,342	+8.1%
2011	24,401	+9.2%
2021	23,213	−4.9%
Source: Censuses

== Geography ==
The municipality lies at an altitude of 104 metres (341 ft) and covers an area of 70.15 km^{2} (27.09 sq mi) (2025).

== History ==
The first archaeological findings are from the Neolithic. Tombs were found from the Otomani Culture of the early Bronze Age and the building structures from Hallstatt Culture from late Bronze Age.

The name of Trebišov is first mentioned in 1219 as Terebus, later in 1254 as Terebes, and in 1341 as Therebes, in 1441 the sources depict as Felse Terebes, Also Terebes (Upper and Lower Trebišov). The village is also mentioned in 1330, when it received town status for the first time. The castle and the village became one settlement in the 14th century.

The first written reference to the castle stems from 1254, during the reign of Béla IV of Hungary. This castle of Parič (Párics) stood at the border of the village. The village originally was established to serve the castle. The castle was built by Terebesi family from the Kaplon clan. Charles I of Hungary has conquered the castle in 1317 during the fight with Peter, son of Petenye and granted the land as gift to Philip Drugeth, the ispán of Szepes County, but then returned to royal ownership in 1342, to the Zemplén County. After 1387 the castle was given by Sigismund of Luxemburg to Peter Perényi. Mathias Corvinus has overtaken the castle in 1483 from Stephen Perényi, who became a "robber knight", after a siege and given the castle to the son of the defeated lord. As the Ottomans were approaching in 1536, the castle was reinforced, and further in 1541. The Drugeth family took over the castle by marriage in 1567, but in 1619, Gabriel Bethlen besieged and occupied it.

There is a record that in 1601 there were 31 populated and 94 non-populated houses in the settlement. The Order of Saint Paul the First Hermit had monastery here between 1504 and 1530, and 1630-1781 which is still standing.

The castle was once again reinforced, and Austrian forces occupied it in 1675. In 1682, Emeric Thököly captured it and then fled from continuous Austrian attacks, so they blew the castle up, since then it has been in ruins. In 1692 Leopold I gave his rights on the property by a donation to Theresia Keglevich. From her descendants it came into the possession of the Csáky family. In 1786, the Csáky family was using the ruins to build another castle in the city. This castle moved to the Andrássy family by marriage in 1838 and rebuilt it in Neorenaissance style.

By 1787, the population had grown to 2,366. In 1831, the city was the center of the cholera uprising, which was suppressed by the military on 5 August. In the nineteenth century, the city was impacted by the waves of migration to America. The city's economy improved in the early twentieth century, when several agricultural enterprises were established, such as a sugar processing plant in 1910. In 1911, an electric power station built.

In 1910, there were 2,323 (49.34%) Hungarians and 2,181 (46.33%) Slovak from a population of 4,708. In 1918, the town was occupied by Czechoslovak forces, in 1920, it officially became part of Czechoslovakia with the name Trebišov. In 1929, the town became the seat of its own Trebišov County. During World War II, the Slovak population supported the partisan groups. The city was occupied by the Soviet Army on 1 December 1944. In January 1945, the Slovak National Council was formed here. The population in 2001 was 22,342, of which 87% were Slovak, 8.9% Roma and 1.7% Hungarian.

The city is home to one of the largest Roma communities in the country located on the city's edge. In 2019, it numbered 6685 inhabitants.

== Population ==
Population statistic (10 years)
Year	1995	2005	2015	2025
Count	21,959	23,152	24,500	22,706
Difference		+5.43%	+5.82%	−7.32%

Population statistic
Year	2024	2025
Count	22,780	22,706
Difference		−0.32%

It has a population of 22,706 people (31 December 2025).

=== Ethnicity ===
Census 2021 (1+ %)
Ethnicity	Number	Fraction
Slovak	19,436	83.72%
Romani	3629	15.63%
Not found out	3283	14.14%
Hungarian	306	1.31%
Total	23,213	

In year 2021 was 23,213 people by ethnicity 19,436 as Slovak, 3629 as Romani, 3283 as Not found out, 306 as Hungarian, 123 as Czech, 122 as Rusyn, 54 as Ukrainian, 35 as Vietnamese, 30 as Other, 25 as Russian, 16 as Italian, 15 as German, 13 as Serbian, 8 as English, 7 as Turkish, 5 as Jewish, 5 as Polish, 4 as Moravian, 3 as Chinese, 3 as Croatian, 3 as Albanian, 2 as Greek, 2 as French, 1 as Silesian and 1 as Iranian.

Note on population: The difference values of population numbers in the table "Population statistic" and in the sections "Ethnicity" & "Religion" is caused by the use of various statistical methods.

=== Religion ===
Census 2021 (1+ %)
Religion	Number	Fraction
Roman Catholic Church	9148	39.41%
Greek Catholic Church	4839	20.85%
Not found out	3181	13.7%
None	2977	12.82%
Eastern Orthodox Church	1781	7.67%
Calvinist Church	604	2.6%
Evangelical Church	256	1.1%
Total	23,213	

In year 2021 was 23,213 people by religion 9148 from Roman Catholic Church, 4839 from Greek Catholic Church, 3181 from Not found out, 2977 from None, 1781 from Eastern Orthodox Church, 604 from Calvinist Church, 256 from Evangelical Church, 205 from Jehovah's Witnesses, 39 from Christian Congregations in Slovakia, 38 from Apostolic Church, 36 from Other and not ascertained christian church, 33 from Ad hoc movements, 30 from Other, 12 from Islam, 12 from Buddhism, 7 from Paganism and natural spirituality, 7 from United Methodist Church, 5 from Seventh-day Adventist Church, 1 from Jewish community, 1 from Old Catholic Church and 1 from Hinduism.

== Climate ==
Climate data for Trebišov (located in nearby Milhostov) 1991−2020
Month	Jan	Feb	Mar	Apr	May	Jun	Jul	Aug	Sep	Oct	Nov	Dec	Year
Record high °C (°F)	13.7 (56.7)	17.5 (63.5)	23.0 (73.4)	29.5 (85.1)	32.4 (90.3)	35.1 (95.2)	38.2 (100.8)	37.2 (99.0)	36.0 (96.8)	26.7 (80.1)	22.5 (72.5)	14.0 (57.2)	38.2 (100.8)
Mean daily maximum °C (°F)	0.9 (33.6)	3.5 (38.3)	10.1 (50.2)	17.1 (62.8)	21.7 (71.1)	25.2 (77.4)	27.4 (81.3)	27.4 (81.3)	21.6 (70.9)	15.1 (59.2)	8.0 (46.4)	2.0 (35.6)	15.0 (59.0)
Daily mean °C (°F)	−1.7 (28.9)	−0.1 (31.8)	4.8 (40.6)	10.9 (51.6)	15.7 (60.3)	19.3 (66.7)	21.0 (69.8)	20.7 (69.3)	15.3 (59.5)	9.7 (49.5)	4.6 (40.3)	−0.4 (31.3)	10.0 (50.0)
Mean daily minimum °C (°F)	−4.4 (24.1)	−3.4 (25.9)	0.1 (32.2)	4.8 (40.6)	9.6 (49.3)	13.2 (55.8)	14.8 (58.6)	14.6 (58.3)	10.2 (50.4)	5.4 (41.7)	1.4 (34.5)	−2.9 (26.8)	5.3 (41.5)
Record low °C (°F)	−20.9 (−5.6)	−19.2 (−2.6)	−14.5 (5.9)	−6.4 (20.5)	−1.5 (29.3)	3.6 (38.5)	5.4 (41.7)	5.7 (42.3)	0.8 (33.4)	−7.8 (18.0)	−12.2 (10.0)	−21.1 (−6.0)	−21.1 (−6.0)
Average precipitation mm (inches)	24.4 (0.96)	27.1 (1.07)	27.5 (1.08)	38.2 (1.50)	66.1 (2.60)	71.0 (2.80)	85.7 (3.37)	60.0 (2.36)	57.0 (2.24)	48.5 (1.91)	39.0 (1.54)	34.7 (1.37)	579.2 (22.80)
Average precipitation days (≥ 1.0 mm)	6.1	6.4	5.6	6.9	9.1	9.3	9.8	6.4	7.2	6.9	7.0	7.5	88.2
Average snowy days	9.2	7.7	3.5	0.7	0.0	0.0	0.0	0.0	0.0	0.2	2.9	7.4	31.6
Average relative humidity (%)	85.5	81.1	71.9	66.0	69.7	70.7	69.2	69.2	74.6	80.7	85.6	87.0	75.9
Mean monthly sunshine hours	52.7	81.2	155.3	203.7	240.4	251.8	258.4	267.5	190.8	128.6	62.7	38.9	1,932
Source: NOAA

== Noteworthy structures ==
- Parič Castle ruins – built 1786 using stones of a water castle from the 13th century, with:
  - a National History and Geography Museum – in the castle
  - a park – once one of the prettiest parks in Austria-Hungary, contains remnants of the old water castle (13th century - 1786)
- Andrássy Mausoleum – a nice neo-Gothic mausoleum of 1896
- Catholic church – c. 1400, Gothic, reconstructed in 1696
- Pauline monastery – 1502, connected with the Catholic Church
- Orthodox church – 1825
- manor house – 1786, adapted in the Empire – neo-Renaissance style

=== Roman Catholic Church of Virgin Mary's Annunciation ===
The church has been dated to 1404. It is an example of Gothic architecture. The church has a main part and the aisle chapels. The interior is composed of the altars, murals and a triumphal arch. On the ceiling, there are painted scenes from the life of the Virgin Mary. In the church there are set two marble epitaphs of János and Imre Perényi, the paintings "The Virgin Mary's Annunciation" (1780), "Saint Pavel Hermit" (18th century), "Saint Justin Martyr" (1835), a stone baptistery (18th century) and a pseudo-Rococo seat. Under the church, there are crypts of the Pereny's family and Péter Szapáry and Júlia Csáky.

=== Pauline Monastery ===
The monastery was built in 1502, and two years later, Imre Perenyi invited the Pauline monks to the monastery. The object of the Renaissance monastery in the shape of "L" had been linked right to the church with the south wing. The monastery was reconstructed, in 1678 and in 1760. With the elimination of the Pauline order in 1786 by King Joseph II., the monastery lost its original function and has since been used for many purposes. Now, it houses the Elementary Arts School and the Roman Catholic Parsonage Office.

=== Immaculata ===
The Immaculata is a work of art of an unknown sculptor. It was erected around 1800. There are three statues: The main is Madonna trampling a snake; on her right there is a statue of St. John of Nepomuk; on her left a statue of the patron and protector from fire, St. Florian. At present, it is placed in its third place. Originally it was placed in front of the manor house. Later, in 1907, it was placed south of the church, on the edge of the city park. In the 1980s, it was restored and placed between the Roman- and Greek-Catholic churches.

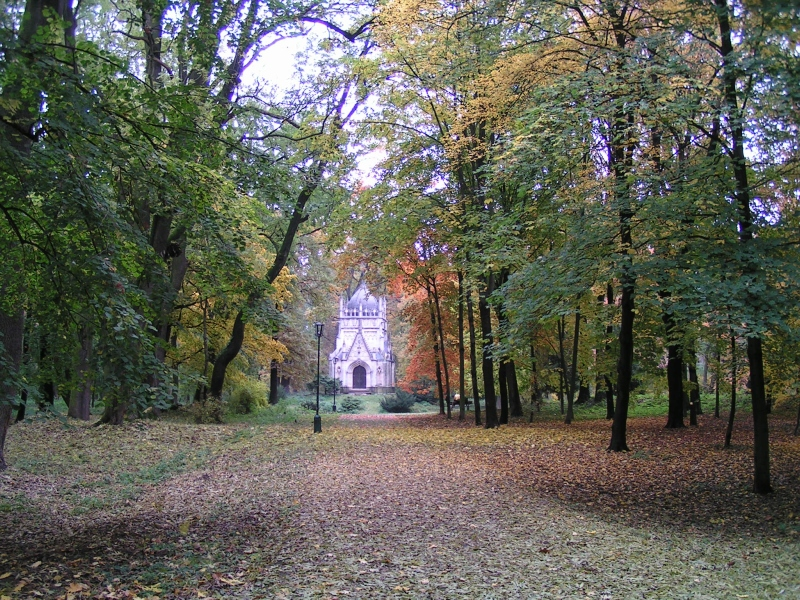
Mausoleum of the Andrássy family

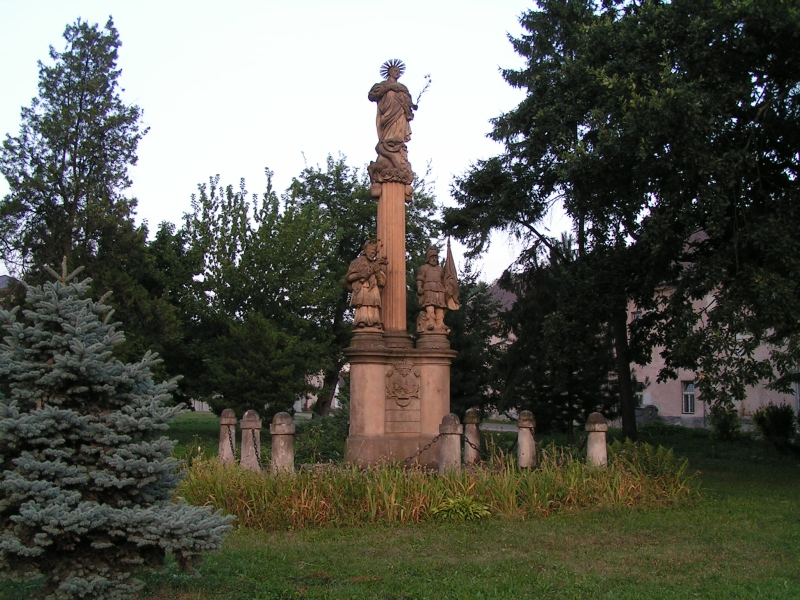
Immaculata

=== Greek-Catholic Church of Virgin Mary's Ascension ===
The cornerstone of the church was put in 1817. It was built by the architect József Turcsány during the years 1818–1825. It was dedicated in 1826. In 1886, its interior was rebuilt. There are many icons: The Death of Virgin Mary, icons of Jesus Christ, St. Nicholas, Twelve Apostles, Virgin Mary and John the Baptist. The sacristy, the art lustre and ceramic floor date to 1901, and the art windows to 1907. In the 1920s, the bell called "Georgij" (George) was added.

=== Ruins of Parič Castle ===
The first stage of the construction of the water castle (probably an inhabited tower with fortifications) can be dated to the 12th to 13th centuries. Pieces of pottery that have been found confirm this. The upper polygonal construction made by stone-based bricks was built in the second stage of construction, in the early 14th century. Research has confirmed that simultaneously with the fortification on the western side, an early-Gothic palace was built. On the east side of the castle a quadrangle entrance tower was built and at the courtyard was a well, fortified by stone.yhh

=== The Trebišov Park ===
The Park of Trebišov occupies an area of 62 ha. The park was originally part of a swamp-mire forest. The park began to be laid out in the 18th century. It started as an English countryside forest with buttonwoods and other trees imported from around the world. Today, the park is used for recreation, cultural and social events, and as a historical and archaeological site. In the area of the park there are, in addition to noteworthy fauna and flora, some historical monuments.

=== Church of the Holy Spirit ===
This church is one of Trebišov's oldest. Its foundations were discovered by chance at the Centre of Young Natural Scientists in Trebišov. Its existence confirmed the records of Popes Corporals from 1332 to 1337. The archaeological research has shown that the church had a rectangular nave. In 65 graves, this dead were buried on their backs without coffins, and primarily without gifts. Jewels, elements of clothing and coins were found in 16 graves. These included earrings, rings, Hungarian coins from second half of the 12th century and first third of the 13th century, and three cast bronze crucifixes, which belonged probably to the Eastern Church (Kievan Rus). Based on these discoveries, the church can be dated back to the first half of the 13th century, and its extension to around 1400.

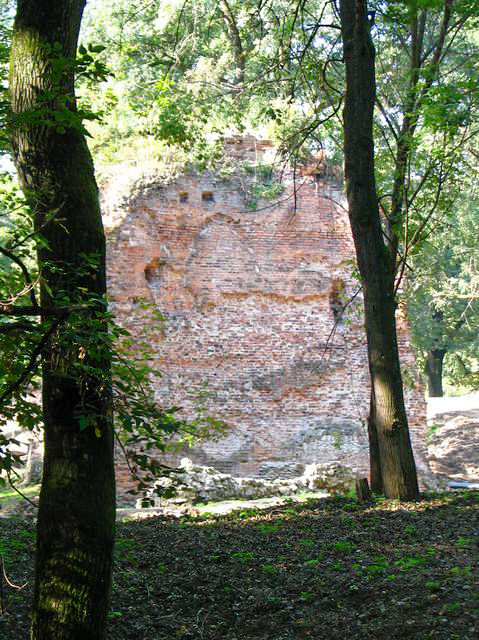
Ruins of Parič (Párics) Castle in the Trebišov park

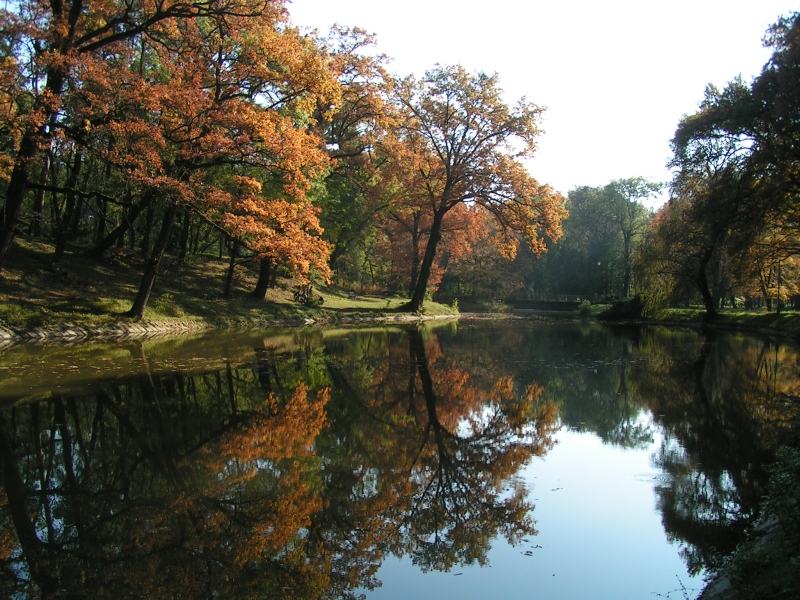
Trebišov park in the autumn months

=== Mausoleum of The Andrássy Family in The Town Park ===
The Mausoleum is one of the most beautiful monuments in Trebišov. It was built in the neo-Gothic style in 1893 by the German architect Arthur Meinig. The sarcophagus is a work of the Hungarian sculptor György Zala from the years 1893–1895. The Mausoleum houses the grave of count Gyula Andrássy from 1894, who was prime minister of Austria-Hungary (1867). In the sarcophagus, there are relicts of his wife Katalin Andrássy. Above the sarcophagus there are two bronze cartouches with the emblems of the count and his wife. Beside that there is the tin coffin of Tódor Andrássy (1857–1905). There is a sculpture of an angel. Near the sarcophagus, there is a bronze sculpture of Helena, the wife of count Lajos Batthyány. In the interior there are the starry vault and the neo-Gothic windows.

=== National History Museum ===
In 1786, count Imre Csáky started construction on a great Baroque castle. The three-winged castle has a U-shaped floor-plan. The terrace is supported by eight Classicistic pillars. In the Baroque gable there are emblems of the Csáky and Andrássy families. The castle has a large French garden with a fountain and a labyrinth. From 1916, the castle housed military barracks and after the Second World War a hospital. Today the castle is used as the National History Museum.

== Districts ==
- Nový Majer
- Olšina
- Trebišov proper

== Famous people ==
- Marián Čalfa, politician
- Marek Čech, footballer
- Ján Novák, footballer
- Kamila Domaracka (famous Slovak singer and acrylic artist)
- Count Gyula Andrássy de Csíkszentkirály et Krasznahorka the Younger, Hungarian politician

== Twin towns — sister cities ==
Trebišov is twinned with:

- Hodonín, Czech Republic
- Jasło, Poland
