= Istebné =

- Municipality
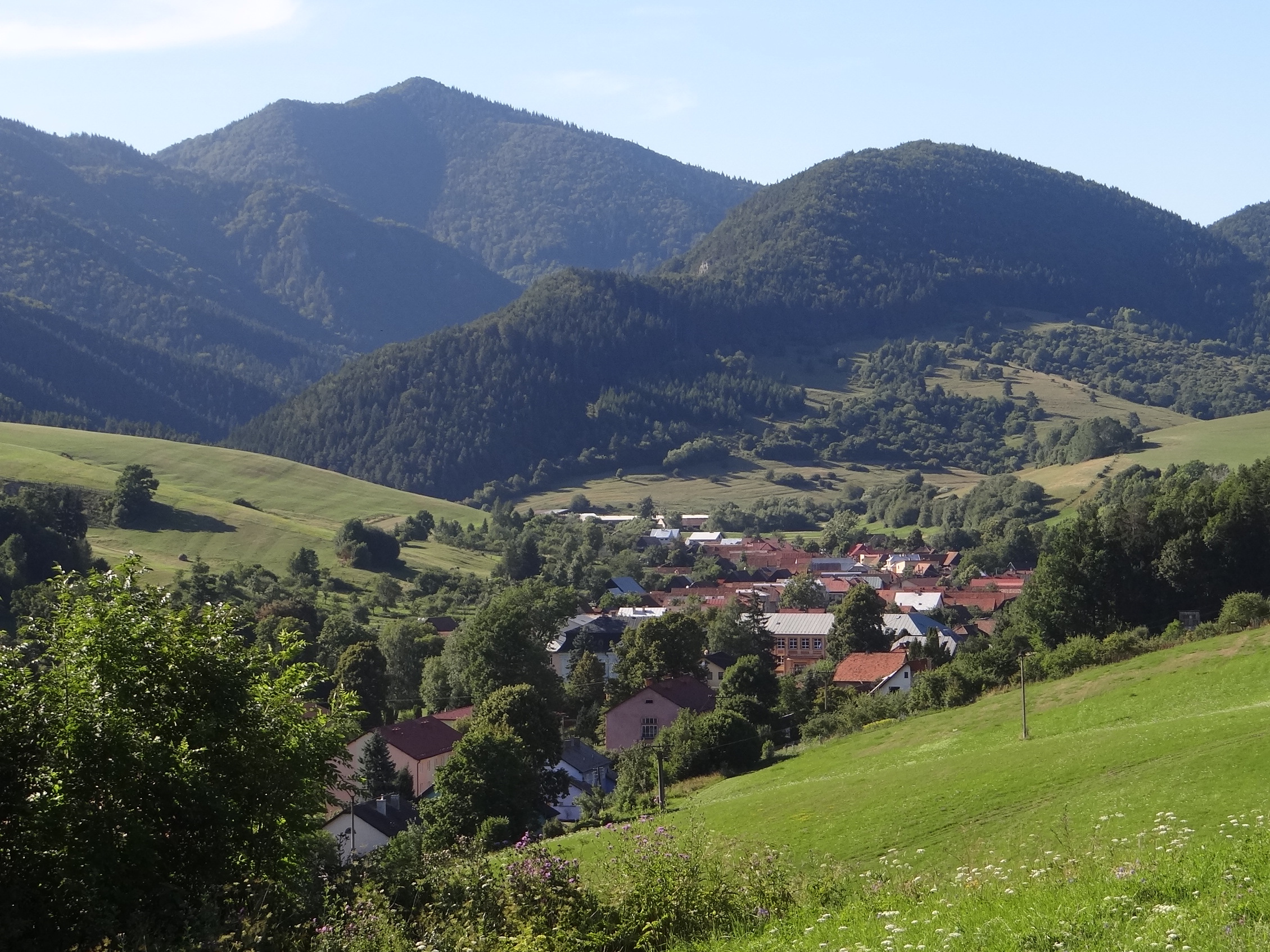

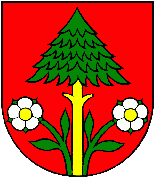
- Flag Coat of arms

- Location of Istebné in the Žilina Region Location of Istebné in Slovakia
- Coordinates: 49.22°N 19.22°E
- Country: Slovakia
- Region: Žilina Region
- District: Dolný Kubín District
- First mentioned: 1316

Area
  - Total: 11.29 km^{2} (4.36 sq mi)
- Elevation: 490 m (1,610 ft)

Population (2025)
  - Total: 1,275
- Time zone: UTC+1 (CET)
  - Summer (DST): UTC+2 (CEST)
- Postal code: 275 3
- Area code: +421 43
- Vehicle registration plate (until 2022): DK
- Website: istebne.sk

Istebné (Hungarian: Isztebne) is a village and municipality in Dolný Kubín District in the Žilina Region of northern Slovakia.

== Geography ==
The municipality lies at an altitude of 490 metres (1,610 ft) and covers an area of 11.29 km^{2} (4.36 sq mi) (2025).

== History ==
Before the establishment of independent Czechoslovakia in 1918, Istebné was part of Árva County within the Kingdom of Hungary. From 1939 to 1945, it was part of the Slovak Republic.

== Population ==
Population statistic (10 years)
Year	1995	2005	2015	2025
Count	1471	1427	1333	1275
Difference		−2.99%	−6.58%	−4.35%

Population statistic
Year	2024	2025
Count	1286	1275
Difference		−0.85%

It has a population of 1275 people (31 December 2025).

=== Ethnicity ===
Census 2021 (1+ %)
Ethnicity	Number	Fraction
Slovak	1292	95.06%
Not found out	65	4.78%
Total	1359	

In year 2021 was 1359 people by ethnicity 1292 as Slovak, 65 as Not found out, 6 as Czech, 4 as Romani, 3 as Hungarian, 2 as Russian, 2 as Other, 1 as Ukrainian and 1 as German.

Note on population: The difference values of population numbers in the table "Population statistic" and in the sections "Ethnicity" & "Religion" is caused by the use of various statistical methods.

=== Religion ===
Census 2021 (1+ %)
Religion	Number	Fraction
Evangelical Church	556	40.91%
Roman Catholic Church	415	30.54%
None	267	19.65%
Not found out	98	7.21%
Total	1359	

In year 2021 was 1359 people by religion 556 from Evangelical Church, 415 from Roman Catholic Church, 267 from None, 98 from Not found out, 6 from Greek Catholic Church, 5 from Christian Congregations in Slovakia, 5 from Ad hoc movements, 3 from Other, 2 from Paganism and natural spirituality, 1 from Eastern Orthodox Church and 1 from Buddhism.

== See also ==
- List of municipalities and towns in Slovakia

== Genealogical resources ==
The records for genealogical research are available at the state archive "Statny Archiv in Bytca, Slovakia"

- Lutheran church records (births/marriages/deaths): 1781-1933 (parish A)
