= Slovenská Sporiteľňa =

Slovenská sporiteľňa, a.s.
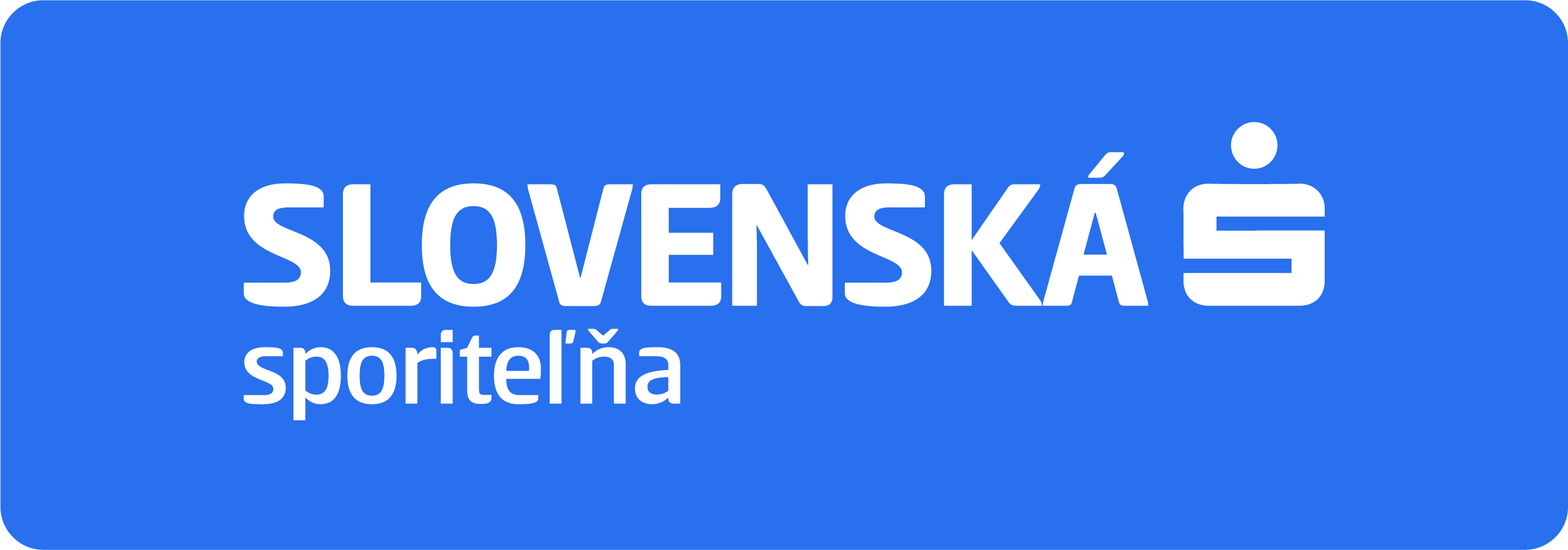

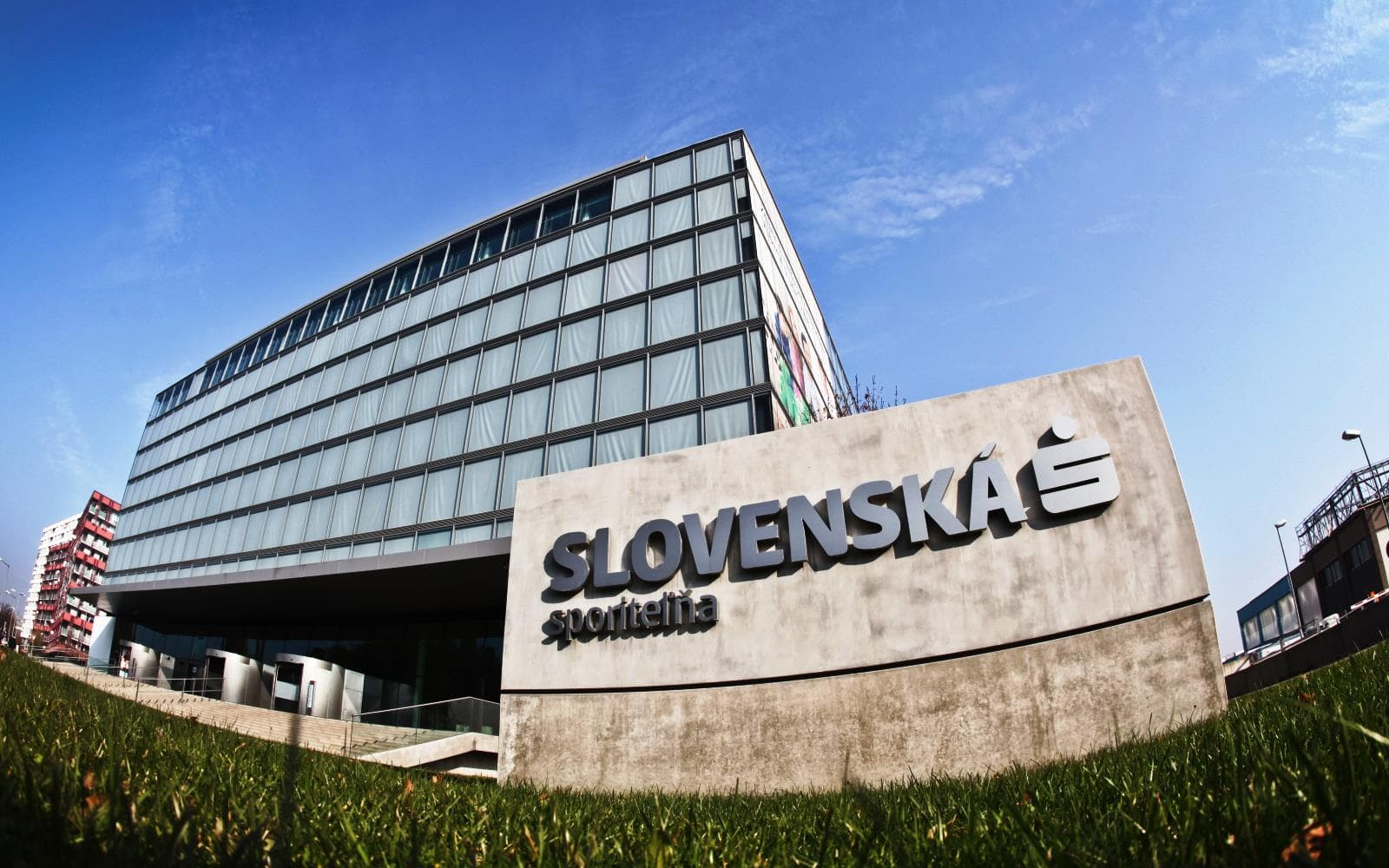
- Slovenská sporiteľňa headquarters in Bratislava
- Type: Public company
- Industry: Financial services
- Founded: 1819; 207 years ago, 1925
- Headquarters: Bratislava, Slovakia
- Key people: Michaela Bauer (CEO)
- Products: Banking, insurance, asset management, leasing and factoring
- Number of employees: 3,540 (2023)
- Parent: Erste Group
- Website: www.slsp.sk

Slovenská sporiteľňa ("Slovak Savings Bank") is the largest Slovak commercial bank. It provides banking services to more than 2 million clients via a distribution network of over 400 retail outlets.

By 2026, it administered almost 6 million accounts. In 2001, the bank became part of Erste Group.

== History ==
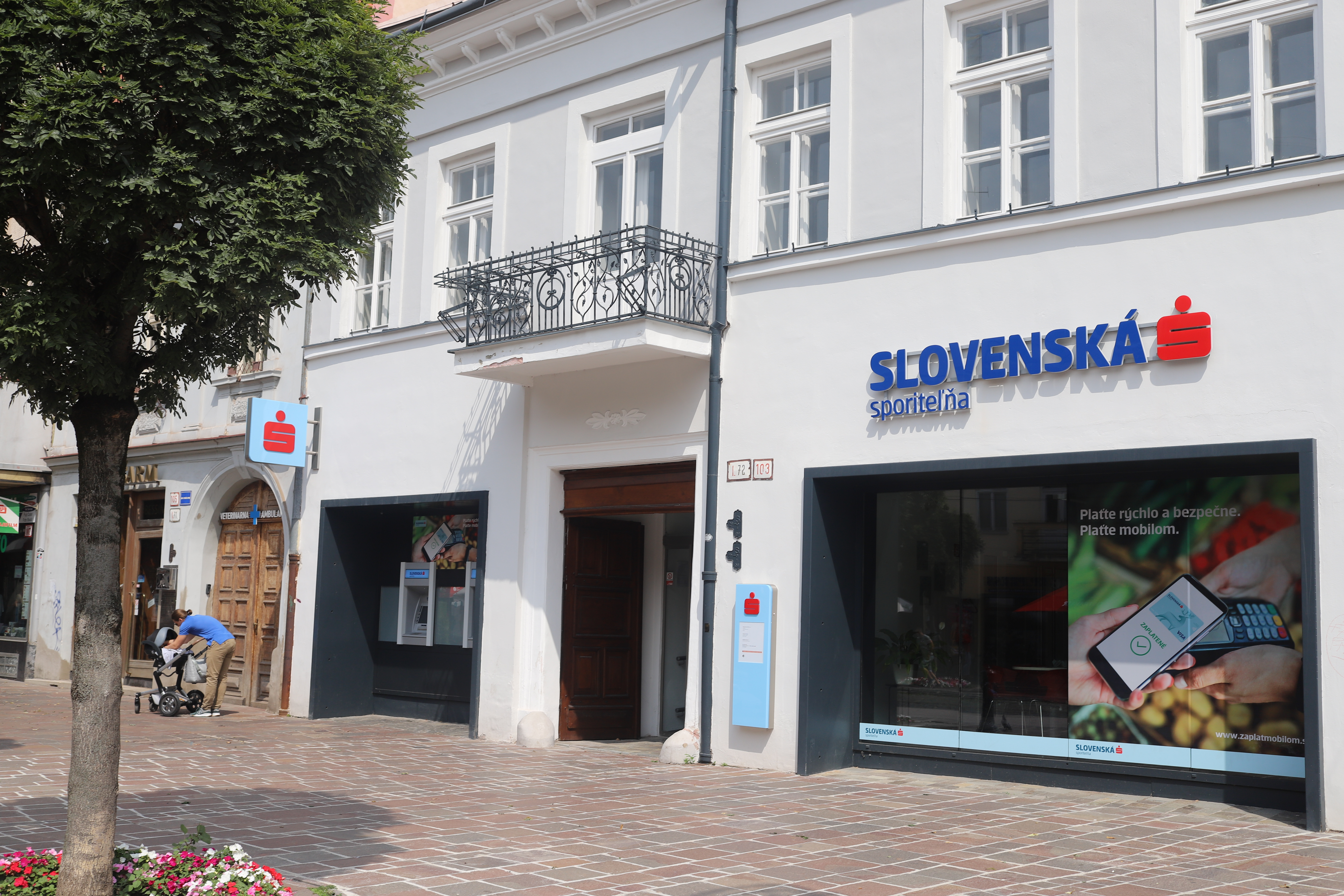
Branch of Slovenská sporiteľňa in Košice, August 2019

Slovenská sporiteľňa is the oldest out of all the banking institutions in Slovakia and dates back to the 19th century.

- 1819 – first branches of Die Erste oesterreichische Spar-Casse in Pressburg (Bratislava), Trnava, Banská Bystrica and Levoča
- 1841/42 – first savings banks in Pressburg – Pressburger Spar-Casse
- 1844 – savings banks in Košice and Trnava
- 1845 – savings banks in Komárno, Prešov and Zvolen
- 1846 – 1848 – savings banks established in majority of the cities, Banská Štiavnica, Kremnica, Lučenec, Nové Zámky, Spišská Nová Ves
- 1953 – part of Štátna banka československá súčasť Štátnej banky československej
- 1969 – active as Slovenská štátna sporiteľňa, š.p.ú. (Slovak State Savings Bank)
- 1990 – universal banking license
- 1991 – entered the money and capital market
- 1994 – transformation to Slovenská sporiteľňa, a.s. (Slovak Savings Bank join-stock company)
- 1998 – 2000: transformation process for privatization of the bank
- 2000 – privatization of majority of the shares 87,18 %
- 2001 – became a member of financial group - Erste Bank der oesterreichischen Sparkassen AG

== Ratings ==
Fitch Ratings from 2017Fitch Ratings

- Long-term rating A-
- Short-term rating F1
- Support rating 1
- Viability rating bbb+
- Outlook stable

== Recognition ==
- 2005, 2006, 2011, 2012, 2013, 2014, 2015: Euromoney Awards for Excellence – Best Bank in Slovakia
- 2011, 2012, 2013, 2014, 2014: The Banker – Bank of the Year
- 2012, 2013, 2014, 2015, 2016: TREND – TREND TOP Banka roka
- The Prestigious Smart Bank award in 2024

== See also ==
- List of banks in Slovakia
