= Blue space =

Areas dominated by surface waterbodies

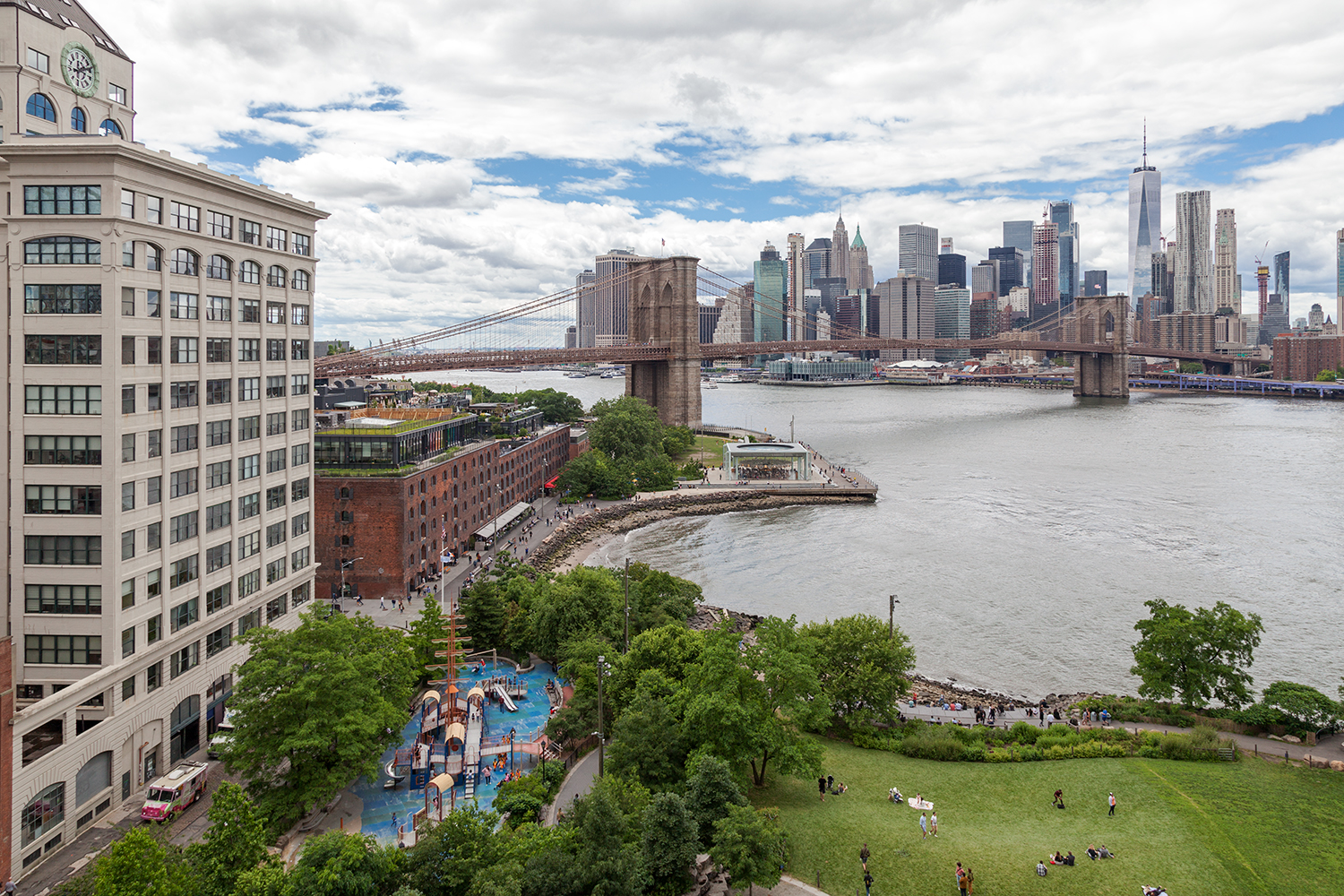
View of Brooklyn Bridge Park from Manhattan Bridge

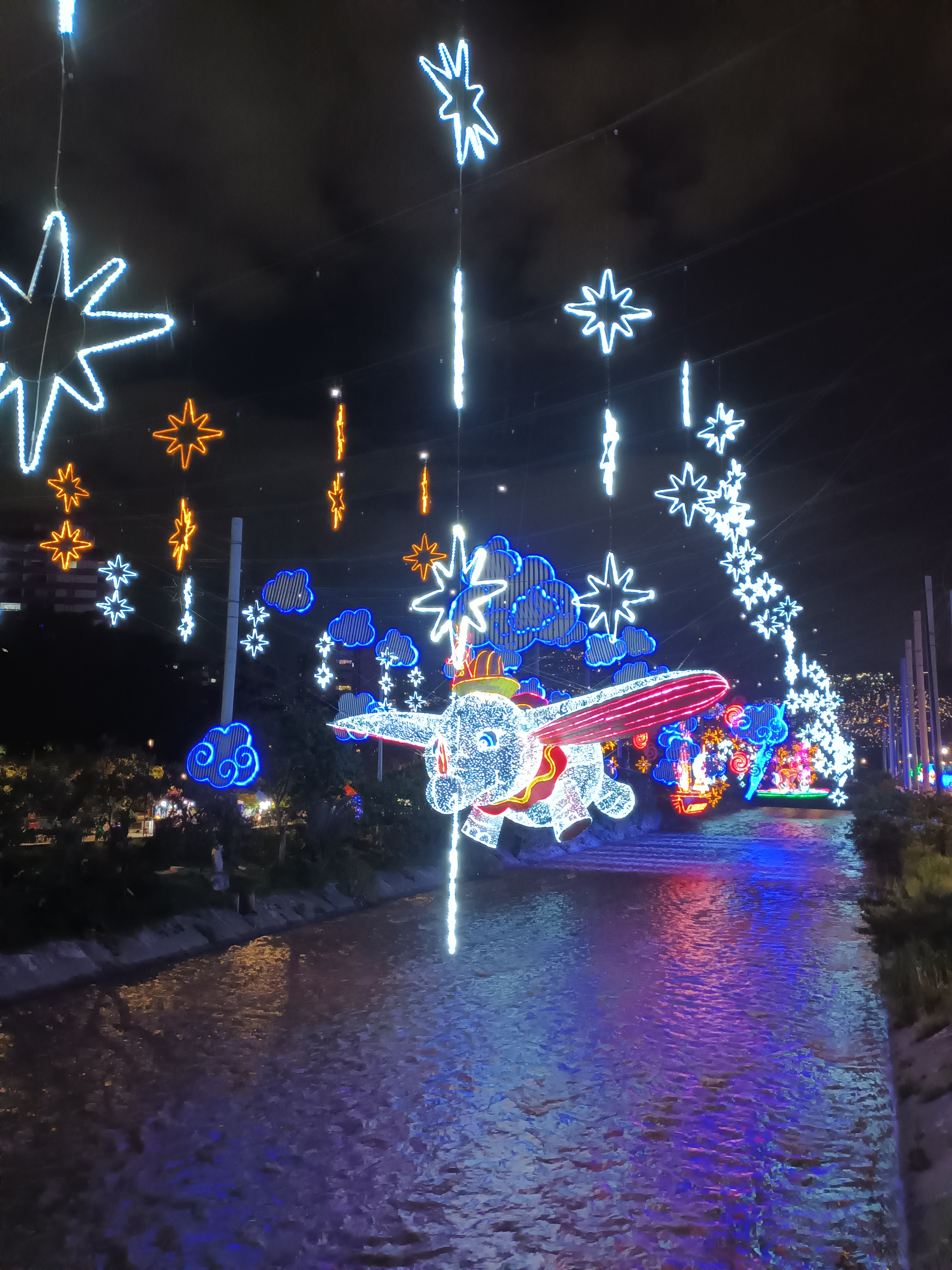
Christmas lights in Medellín, Colombia, in 2023

In urban planning and design, blue space (or blue infrastructure) comprises areas dominated by surface waterbodies or watercourses. In conjunction with greenspace (parks, gardens, etc. specifically: urban open space), it may help in reducing the risks of heat-related illness from high urban temperatures (urban heat island). Substantial urban waterbodies naturally exist as integral features of the geography of many cities because of their historical development, for example the River Thames in London.

Accessible blue spaces can help revitalizing neighborhoods and promote increased social connectedness as seen on waterfront renovation projects like the Chattanooga Waterfront (Chattanooga, Tennessee), the CityDeck in Green Bay, Wisconsin, or the Brooklyn Bridge Park in New York City, further enhanced by waterfront festivals such as the Christmas lights in Medellin, in Colombia. Design guidelines promoting healthy buildings -such as, WELL -managed by The International WELL Building Institute™ (IWBI™), or Fitwel -developed and managed by The Center for Active Design (CfAD), recommend incorporating including and water features as a strategy to improve the health and wellness of the building occupants, and "the 9 foundations of a Healthy Building" -developed at Harvard T.H. Chan School of Public Health-, also recommends indoor access to nature views or nature-inspired elements.

Because neighborhoods with access to attractive natural features are susceptible to gentrification, the social benefits associated with waterbodies can be unequally distributed, with less affluent areas lacking access to good quality blue spaces.

== Health benefits ==
Proximity to water bodies may bring some risks to humans, like water-borne diseases in drinking water, flooding risks, or drowning. But scientific evidence shows that exposure to blue spaces is also associated with a variety of health benefits to those near water bodies. This is described by marine biologist Wallace J. Nichols in his book Blue Mind. Another of the mechanisms by which this phenomenon can be explained is by the Biophilia hypothesis developed by Edward O. Wilson. This theory states that humans have developed a strong connection with nature throughout their evolution that leads to subconscious seeking for natural environments, including green and blue spaces. Recent research has identified three main pathways that can further explain why proximity to green and blue spaces can be beneficial to health.

- Mitigation addresses these health benefits in relationship to the physical improvements that natural environments bring to the built environment, such as reduction of urban heat island, traffic air pollution or traffic noise.
- Instoration focuses on the promotion of physical activity and other positive outcomes associated with increased physical activity and social connectivity promoted by natural spaces.
- Restoration explains how the non-threatening characteristics of the natural environments may reduce negative feelings and increase cognitive restoration.

Assessing the environmental benefits of a blue space intervention can be done by conducting a Health impact assessment (HIA).

=== Effects on physical health ===
==== Increased physical activity ====
Walkers on a coastal path in Michael, Isle of Man

A variety of studies have found that people living near coastal areas have better health than those living further inland. Some studies have demonstrated that this effect arises due to those living closer the coast being less sedentary and more likely to engage in moderate and vigorous physical activity adequate for health, which could be explained due to the encouraging presence of walk paths along the coast. Another possible explanation is found in the aesthetical attributes of blue spaces that may motivate individuals to engage in physical activities on blue spaces. A study in England found that although more intense activities were conducted on visits to countryside and urban green spaces compared to visits to coastal environments, coastal visits were associated with the highest overall energy expenditure due duration of activity in coastal environments being longer. Results differed by the urbanity or rurality of the respondent's residence and also how far respondents travelled to their destination.

Proximity to water bodies alone is not enough to promote increased levels of physical activity, as those bodies need to be accessible to people. A study focusing on teenagers found that those living near beaches that had a major road between their homes and the water body had lower levels of physical activity than those with direct access to the beach.

==== Reduced obesity ====
Visiting blue spaces may reduce obesity as it promotes increased physical activity. One study has suggested that living far from usable green space or waterfront in urban areas may increase the risk of obesity.

==== Improved respiratory health ====
Living near blue spaces can improve the quality of life of people with respiratory diseases, such as asthma, which could be explained by the mists and sprays generated by the water movement as shown on a study measuring the impact in health of green and blue spaces for those with chronic obstructive pulmonary disease (COPD).

=== Effects on mental health ===
==== Improved overall health ====
Researchers found that individuals across 15 countries in Europe and Australia report better general health when they live closer to the coast or visit it more often. Researchers also found a reduction of psychiatric cases on people living near green or coastal areas. Some of the studies found that ocean exposure or running along river helped war veterans suffering from PTSD. Others found that engaging in water-related activities such as surfing can help coping with mental health issues and help developing self-confidence and self-reliance skills. A large study looking at links between childhood exposure to blue spaces and adult well-being found that exposure to blue spaces in childhood was associated with better adult well-being. A study conducted across 19 countries found that spending leisure time in safe blue spaces can helping restore people's depleted cognitive and emotional resources and help them connect with the natural world.

==== Improved mood and happiness ====
Exposure to blue spaces is also linked to increased happiness. A group of researchers studying the effect of green and blue spaces on happiness used a mobile app to track mood feelings of people when they were near water landscapes. The researchers found increased levels of happiness in people near water bodies. Consistently with the findings focusing on physical health, the positive effects on mood associated to blue spaces seem to diminish as the distance between the residence and the water increases.

==== Improved recovery from drug and alcohol addiction ====
Educational interventions in blue spaces - such as sailing - have been shown to have positive perceived effects on people undergoing drug and alcohol rehabilitation.

== Quality assessment tools ==
In order to understand how blue spaces may influence health-promoting behaviours, a group of researchers that focuses on blue spaces has developed a set of novel tools specifically designed to quantify the quality and potential health benefits of these spaces, risks associated with their use, and environmental quality. The BlueHealth Environmental Assessment Tool (BEAT) - enables comparable assessment of environmental aspects and attributes that influence access to, use of and health-promoting activities in blue spaces. The tool has been developed to be used by communities and urban/landscape designers.

== See also ==
- Dark infrastructure – Areas of low artificial light
- Green infrastructure – Sustainable and resilient infrastructure
- Green belt – Largely undeveloped, wild, or agricultural land surrounding urban areas
- Healthy city – Concept in urban design for health
- Healthy building – Building that promotes health and well-being
- Integrated urban water management
  - Sustainable urban drainage scheme – Designed to reduce the potential impact of development
  - Balancing lake – Element of flood management system
- Linear park – Long strip of naturally occurring land for recreation (most of these include blue spaces by design, particularly rivers and their floodplains)
- Public health – Promoting health through informed choices
- Urban ecology – Scientific study of living organisms
- Urban green space – Green area in an urban location
