= Statue of Janko Kráľ =

Coordinates: 48°08′N 17°06′E

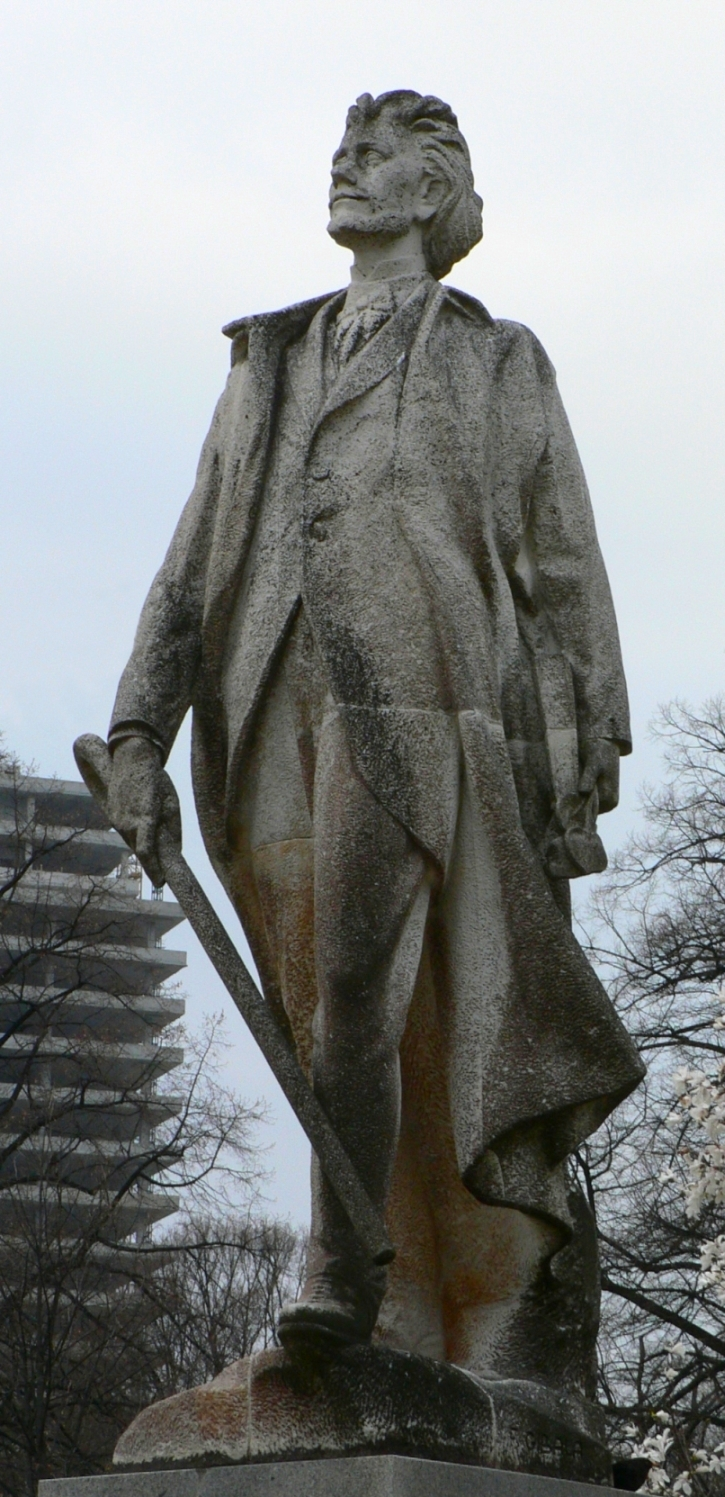
Statue of Janko Kráľ.

Statue of Janko Kráľ is located in the middle of Sad Janka Kráľa (literally Janko Kráľ Park/Garden) in the Petržalka borough in Bratislava, Slovakia.

Janko Kráľ was one of the most significant and most radical Slovak romantic poets of the Ľudovít Štúr generation and a national revivalist. It is not exactly known how he looked, but several popular supposed pictures of him exist. One of them was used as a model for this statue from academic sculptor František Gibala., in 1964.
