= Independence Park (Johor Bahru) =

Park in Johor Bahru, Johor, Malaysia

- Taman Merdeka
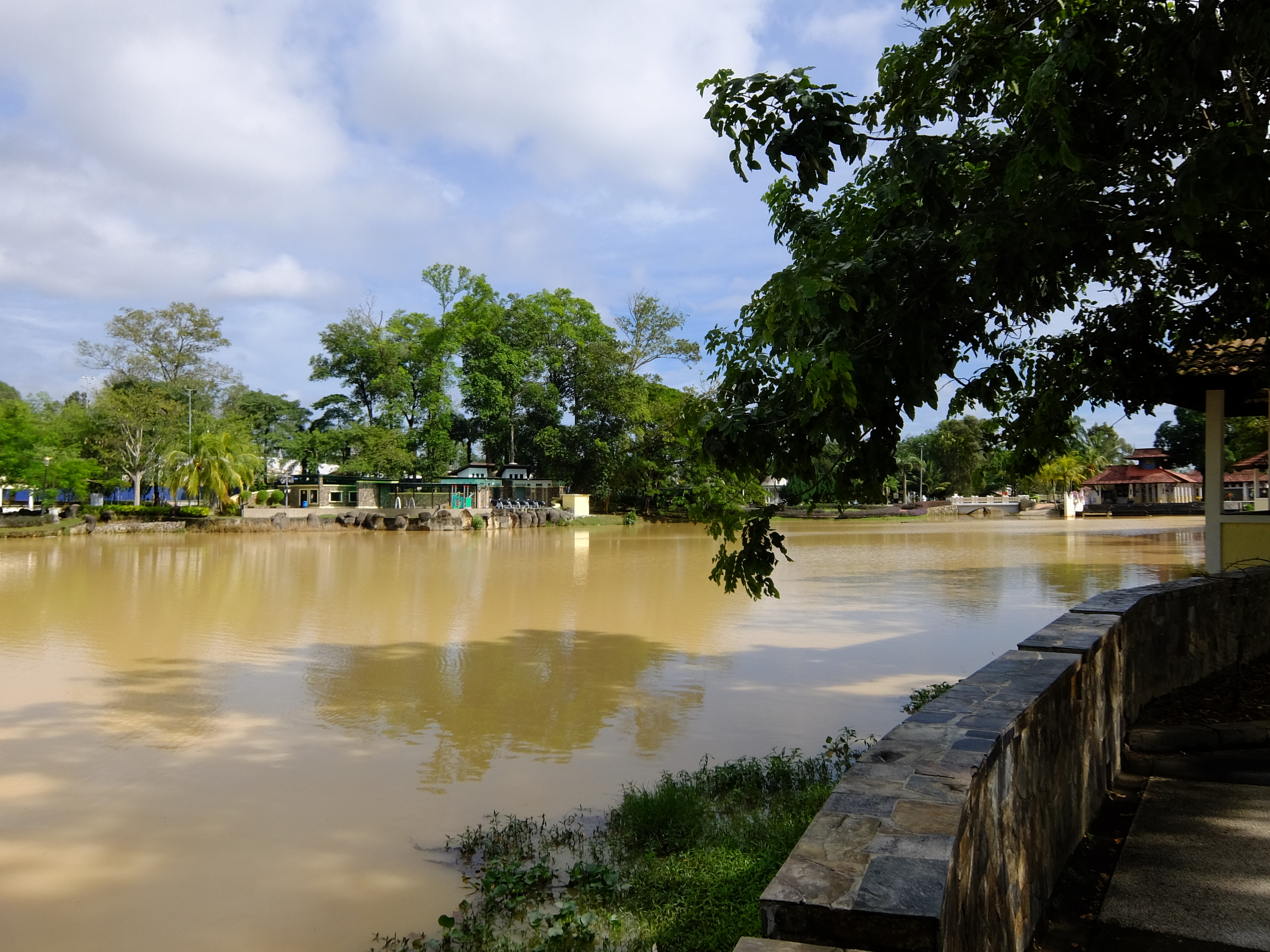
- Interactive map of Independence Park
- Location: Johor Bahru, Johor, Malaysia
- Coordinates: 1°28′47″N 103°44′09″E
- Area: 12.5 hectares (31 acres)
- Established: 2011

Taman Merdeka (translated as Merdeka Park or Independence Park) is a green park located in Johor Bahru, Malaysia.

== Name ==
The park is named after the murals and landmarks dotting it. These murals and landmarks are references to events celebrating the struggle for independence, the independence itself and thus, self-determination from the British colonial power.

== History ==
The park was officially launched in 2011 as a community recreational park.

The park was studied in 2020 by the University of Malaysia as a case study on the use of urban green spaces in Malaysia. The study found, among other things, that most visitors went there to "de-stress" and felt safe there. The park is used much more in the morning and most visitors drive there, both presumably due to the "hot and humid tropical climate".

== Geography ==
Independence Park spans over an area of 12.5 hectares (31 acres). It has a lake in the center of it. The lake is full of water lilies on the water's surface, however the water is brownish in most places. The park also contains an open-air auditorium, which has musical performances on weekends. A pool for kids is also located here, as well as a mini English park called Laman Peringatan Sultan Abu Bakar (translated as Sultan Abu Bakar Memorial Lawn).

The other locations around the park include a jogging circuit, a mini square lined with flags of the state of Johor, and a watch tower.

== Events ==
A celebration of the twentieth anniversary of the Declaration of the City was held there in 2014.

The park is commonly used for community events, such as breast cancer support walk attended by 1200 in 2012 and over one thousand for a World Walking Day event, also in 2012
