= Urban green space =

Green area in an urban location

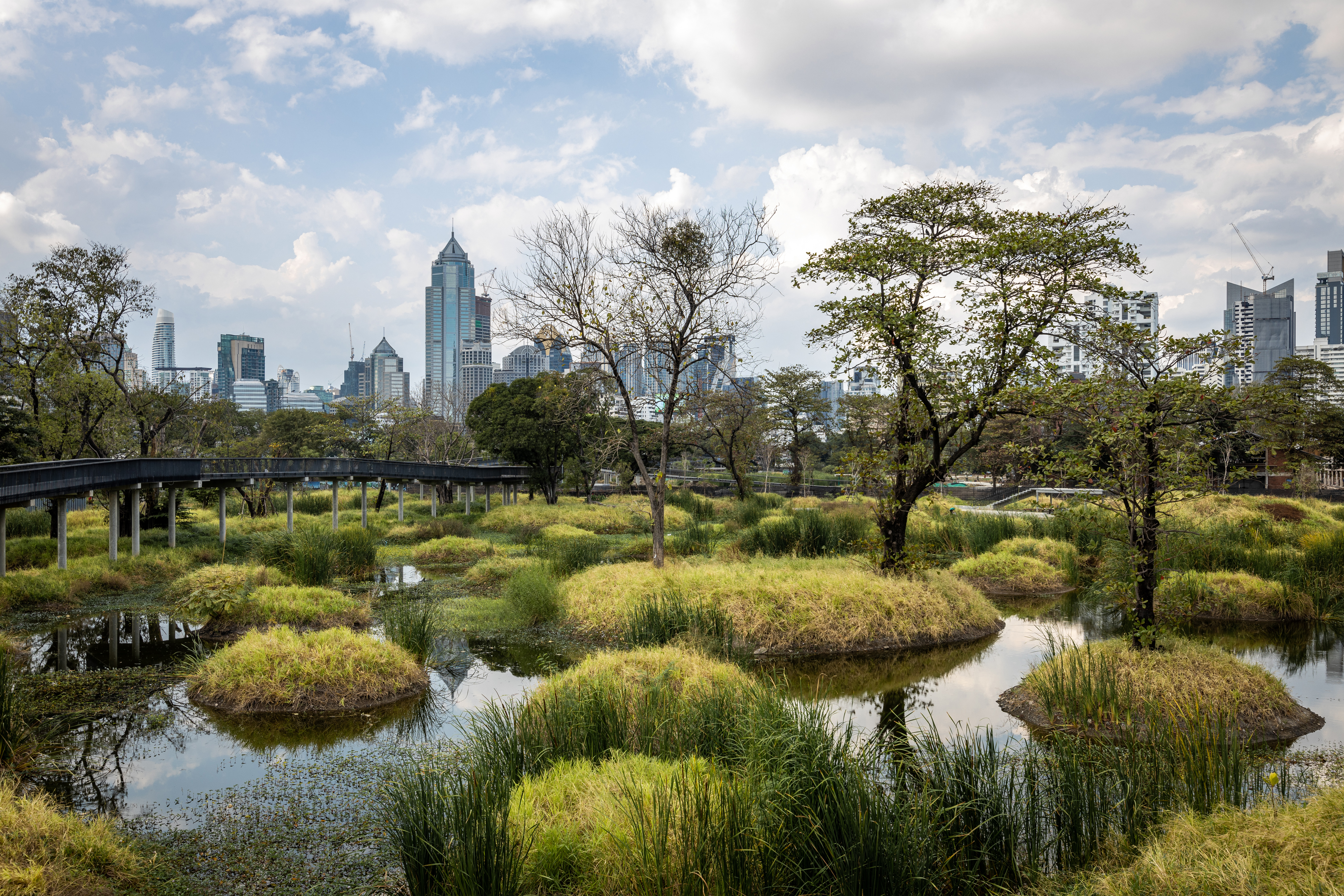
Benjakitti Park in Bangkok

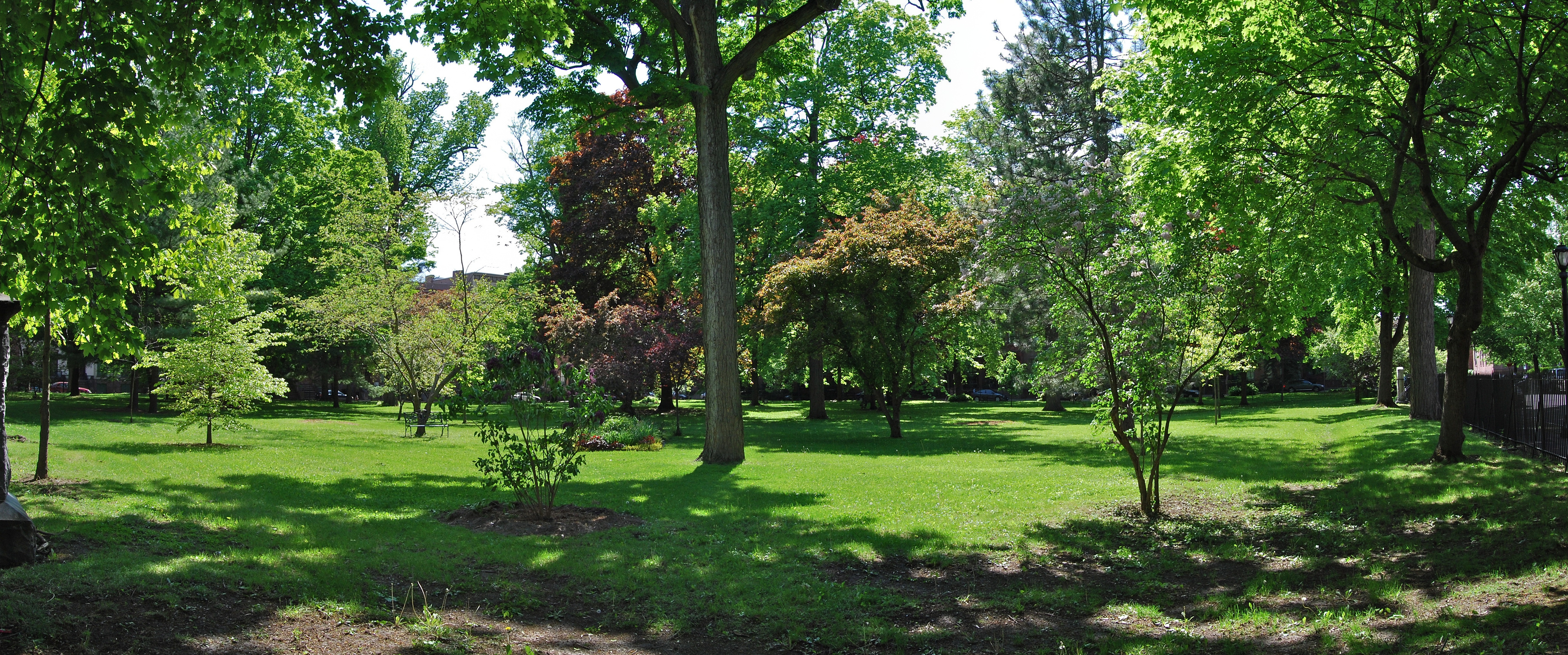
Washington Park in Troy, NY, U.S., an example of privately owned urban open space.

In land-use planning, urban green spaces are open-space areas reserved for parks and other spaces of greenery. These include plant life, water features – also known as blue spaces – and other kinds of natural environments. Most urban open spaces are green spaces, though some may consist of other types of open areas. The landscape of open spaces in urban areas can range from playing fields and other highly maintained environments to more natural landscapes that appear less managed.

Urban green spaces may also include areas that are not publicly accessible, such as privately owned higher education campuses, school sports fields, allotments, neighborhood or community parks and gardens, and corporate campuses. Areas outside city boundaries, such as state and national parks or rural open spaces, are not generally considered urban open spaces. Boulevards, piazzas, plazas, and urban squares are not consistently classified as urban open spaces in land-use planning.

Urban greening policies help revitalize communities, reduce financial burdens on healthcare, and improve quality of life. By promoting the development of parks, green roofs, and community gardens, these policies contribute to cleaner air, mitigate urban heat effects, and create spaces for recreation and social interaction. Most policies focus on community benefits and reducing negative effects of urban development, such as surface runoff and the urban heat island effect. Historically, access to urban green space has favored wealthier and more privileged communities. Recent urban greening has increasingly focused on environmental justice concerns and community engagement in the greening process. In particular, in cities with economic decline, such as in the Rust Belt in the United States, urban greening has broad community revitalization impacts. Urban green spaces have been shown to have a wide-reaching positive impact on the health of individuals and communities near said green space.

== Definitions and concepts ==
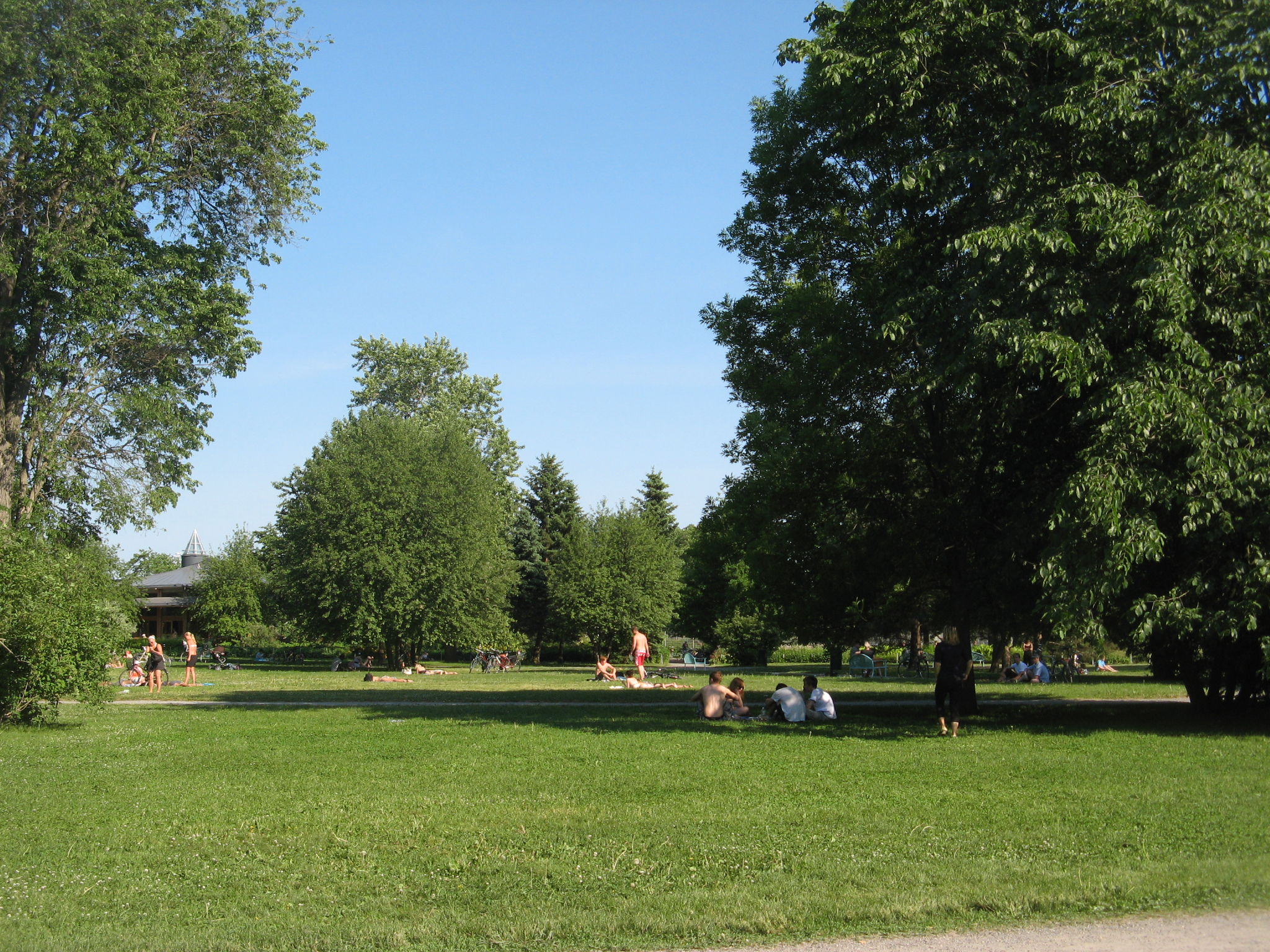
Kupittaa Park (Kupittaanpuisto) is a large urban open space area in Turku, Southwest Finland. It is the largest and oldest park in Finland.

The World Health Organization (WHO) defined urban green spaces as "all urban land covered by vegetation of any kind". In academic literature, "urban open space" or "open space" is often used to describe a broader range of open areas. One extensive definition describes open space as follows:

"Thus open space, very simply, is unclosed space. As the counterpart to development, urban open space is a natural and cultural resource, synonymous with neither "unused land" nor "park and recreation areas." Open space is land and/or water area with its surface open to the sky, consciously acquired or publicly regulated to serve conservation and urban shaping functions in addition to providing recreational opportunities.

In almost all instances, the terms urban green space or urban open and green space refer to open areas that reflect natural areas surrounding the city.

Public spaces are broadly construed, including meeting or gathering places that exist outside the home and workplace. These foster resident interaction and opportunities for contact and proximity. This definition implies a higher level of community interaction and places a focus on public involvement rather than public ownership or stewardship.

== Benefits ==
The benefits that urban open spaces provide to citizens can be categorized into four basic forms: recreation, ecology, aesthetic value, and positive health impacts. Psychological research shows that benefits to visitors of urban green spaces increased with their biodiversity, indicating that "green" alone is not sufficient: the quality and variety of the urban green space are important as well.

=== Recreational ===
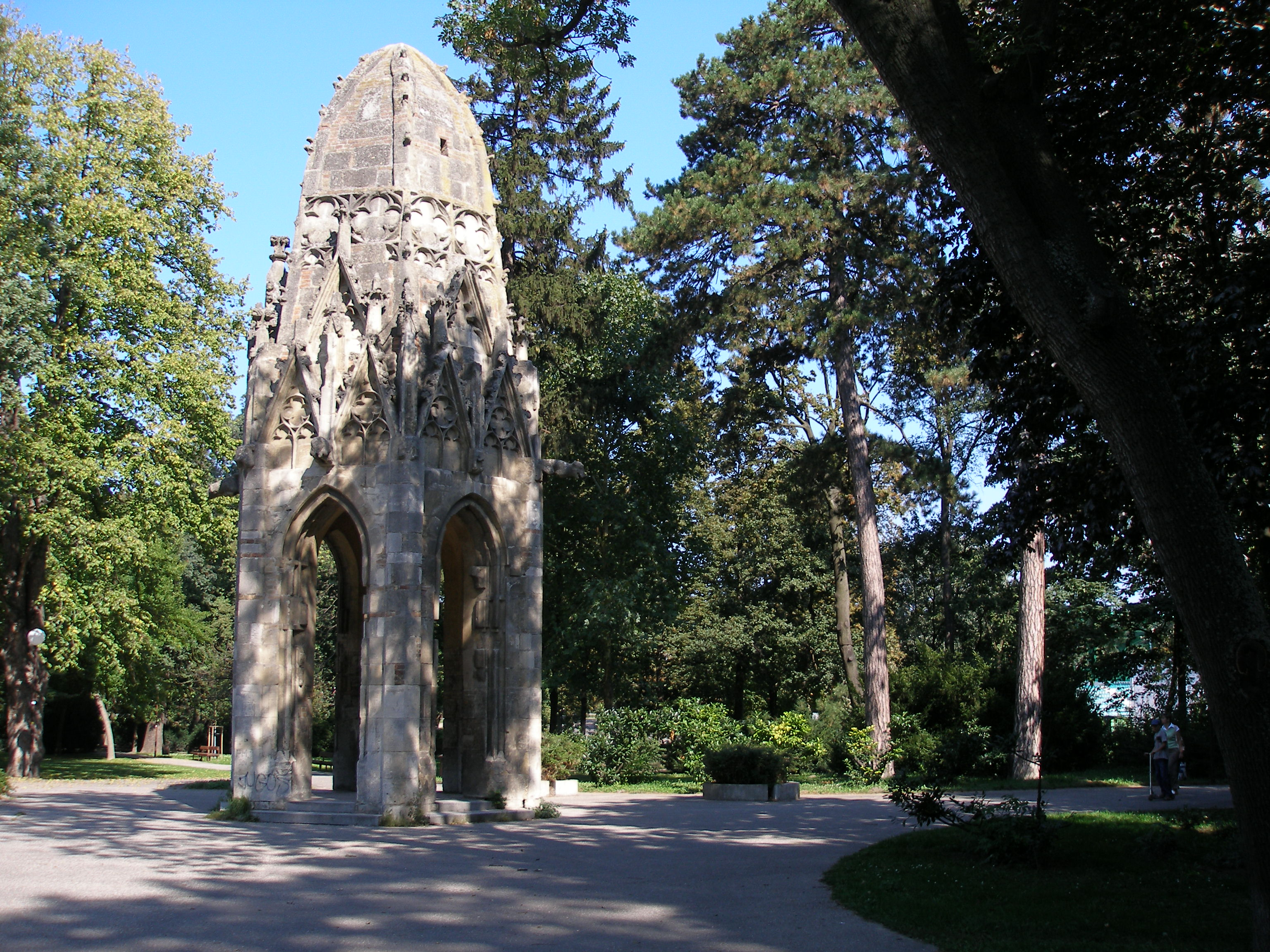
Sad Janka Kráľa park in Bratislava (Slovakia)

Urban open space is often held in esteem for the recreational opportunities it provides. Examples of recreation in urban open spaces include active recreation (such as organized sports and individual exercise) and passive recreation. Research shows that when open spaces are attractive and accessible, people are more likely to engage in physical activity. Time spent in an urban open space for recreation offers a reprieve from the urban environment and a break from over-stimulation. Studies on physically active adults, middle-aged and older, show that there are amplified benefits when physical activities are coupled with green space environments. Such coupling leads to decreased levels of stress, lowers the risk of depression, and increases the frequency of participation in exercise.

=== Ecological ===
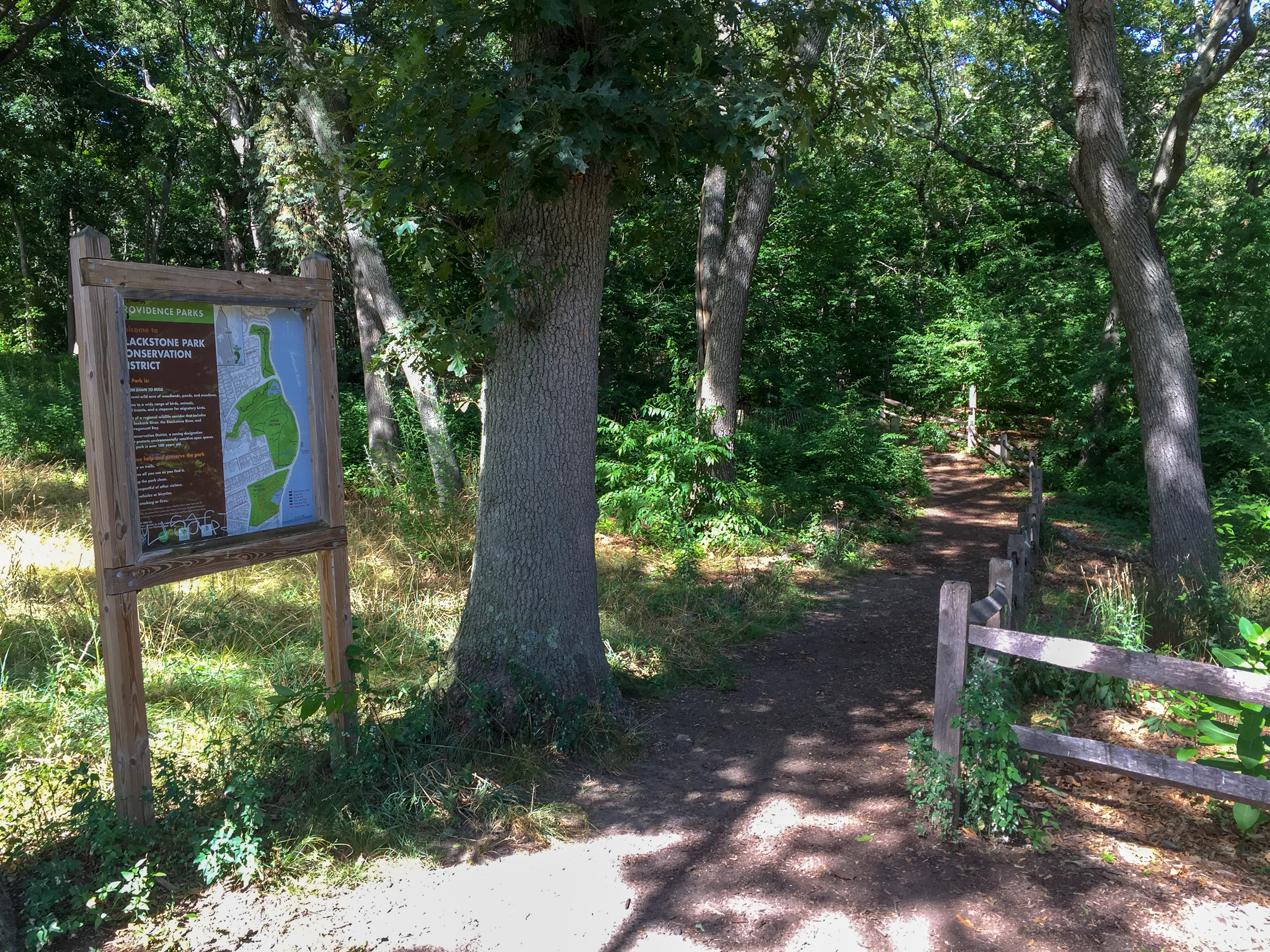
Blackstone Park Conservation District, an urban conservation area in Providence, Rhode Island.

Green spaces may improve the air quality of urban areas and provide habitat for wildlife, improving the overall ecological health of urban environments. They may also reduce the risk of flooding by providing rainwater drainage.

=== Aesthetic ===
Urban spaces also hold a certain aesthetic value. People enjoy viewing nature, especially when it is otherwise scarce, as is the case in urban environments. Therefore, open space offers the value of "substituting gray infrastructure." One researcher notes how attractive neighborhoods contribute to positive attitudes and social norms that encourage walking and community values. Properties near urban open spaces tend to have a higher value. One study was able to demonstrate that "a pleasant view can lead to a considerable increase in house price, particularly if the house overlooks water (8–10%) or open space (6–12%)." Certain benefits may be derived from exposure to virtual versions of the natural environment, too. For example, people who were shown pictures of scenic, natural environments had increased brain activity in the region associated with recalling happy memories, compared to people that were shown pictures of urban landscapes.

=== Impact on health ===
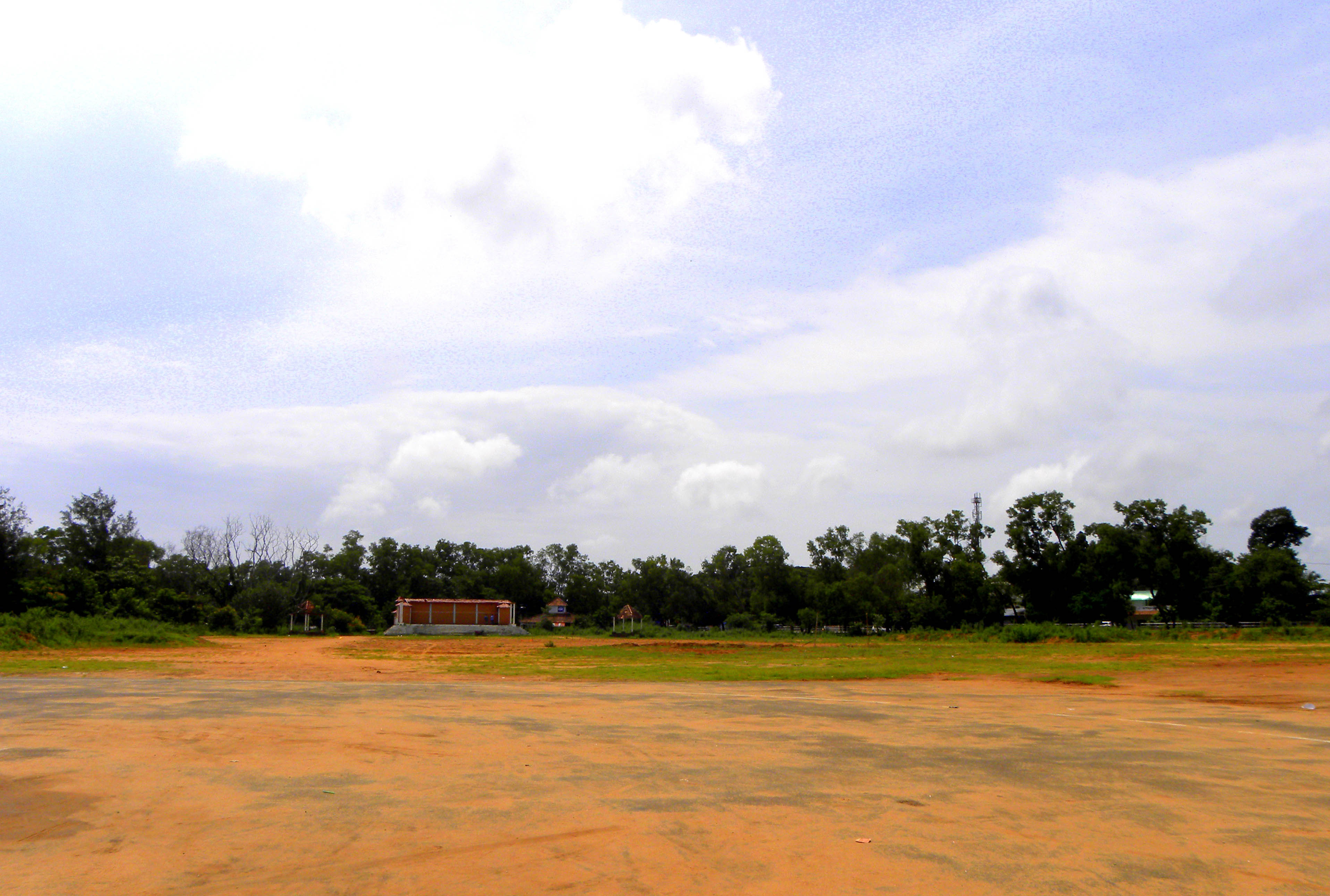
Asramam Maidan in Kollam city, India, is the largest open space available in any of the city limits in Kerala state.

The World Health Organization considers urban green spaces as important to human mental and physical health. Urban open spaces often include trees or other shrubbery that contribute to moderating temperatures and decreasing air pollution. Perceived general health is higher in populations with a higher percentage of green space in their environments. Urban open space access has also been directly related to reductions in the prevalence and severity of chronic diseases resulting from sedentary lifestyles, improvements in mental well-being, reduction in gun violence, and reductions in population-wide health impacts from climate change.

==== Mechanism of urban open space health effects ====
Access to urban open space encourages physical activity and reduces ambient air pollution, heat, traffic noise, and emissions. All are factors which contribute to the risks of chronic disease and mental illness. Individuals and families who lived closer to 'formal' parks or open space were more likely to achieve recommended amounts of physical activity. Urban open space has also been attributed to providing cleaner air quality, thus reducing rates of chronic respiratory diseases among the surrounding population. Urban open space can provide venues for outdoor physical activity which can increase lung function and be a protective factor against respiratory disease. These spaces also offer exposure to nature, which has been proven to boost the immune system by introducing microorganisms to the human body through contact with soil, turf, or forest floor.

==== Reductions in chronic disease rates ====
Improved access to green space is associated with reductions in cardiovascular disease symptoms, improved rates of physical activity, lower incidence of obesity, and improved respiratory health. Lower rates of cardiovascular biomarkers are associated with access to green space, showing a reduction in cardiovascular disease risk in populations living within 1 km of green space. Not only does access to urban green space reduce risk of cardiovascular disease, but increased access has been shown to improve recovery from major adverse cardiovascular events and lower all-cause mortality. Relationships have been found between increased access to green space, improved rates of physical activity, and reduced BMI. The percentage of sedentary and moderately active persons making use of an urban park increased when access to the park was improved.

==== Reductions in mental illness rates and improvement of social cohesion ====
Globally, mental illness is linked to eight million deaths each year. In urban areas, limited access to green space and poor quality of green spaces available may contribute to poor mental health outcomes; according to some studies, people living in cities and towns may have weaker mental health in comparison to people living in less crowded areas. Urban green spaces are pieces of nature in the cities designed to address this problem. The distance an individual lives from a green space or park and the proportion of land designated as open space/parks have been shown to be inversely related to the number of anxiety/mood disorder treatments in the community. Improved mental health may therefore be related to both measures—to distance from open space and proportion of open space within a neighborhood. Even when physical activity rates do not increase with greater access to green space, greater access to green space decreases stress and improves social cohesion.

==== Effects on respiratory health ====
Adequate urban green space access can be associated with better respiratory health outcomes, as long as green space areas meet certain requirements. A study showed that mortality due to pneumonia and chronic lower respiratory diseases could be reduced by minimizing fragmentation of green spaces and increasing the largest patch percentage of green space. Vegetation type (trees, shrubs and herbaceous layers) and lack of management (pruning, irrigation and fertilization) has been shown to affect a higher capacity to provide the ecosystem services of air purification and climate regulation within green urban spaces. The types of plants and shrubs are important because areas with large tree canopies can contribute to asthma and allergic sensitization.

==== Impacts on high temperatures ====
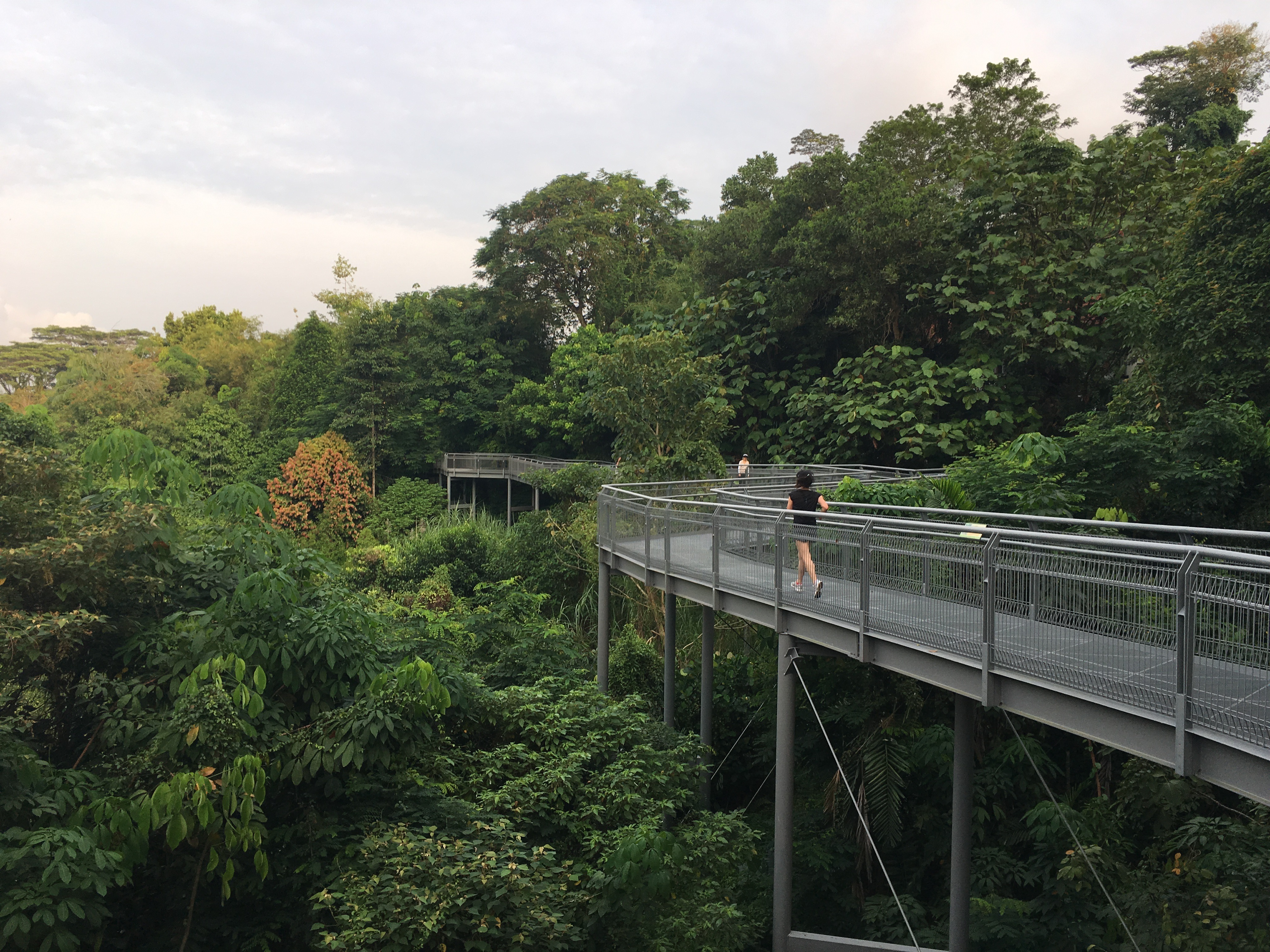
Southern Ridges in Singapore

Urban areas tend to have higher temperatures than their surrounding undeveloped areas because of urban heat islands (UHIs). Urban heat islands are areas with man-made infrastructure that contribute to increased temperatures. The average temperature during the day in cities can be 18–27 degrees Fahrenheit higher than in the surrounding rural regions. This is an example of surface heat islands, a type of UHI, which encompasses the area from the ground to the top of the tree-line or mean roof height. It is usually higher during the day when direct sunlight reaches urban structures (often with darker materials than natural areas), particularly pavement. The other type of UHI, atmospheric heat islands, reaches from above the tree-line or mean roof height to the level in the atmosphere where the urban area no longer has an effect. This type of heat island has increased heat at night due to the release of heat from infrastructure that was built up throughout the day.

Green spaces within urban areas can help reduce these increased temperatures through shading and evapotranspiration. Shading comes from the taller plants, such as trees, that can contribute to lowering the surface heat island effect. The shade provides protection from the sun for vulnerable populations, such as children, during periods of increased temperature, during the summer months, or during a heat wave. Tree cover prevents some solar radiation from reaching the ground with its leaves and branches. This reduces the effect of surface urban heat islands. Open spaces that include any type of vegetation help offset the high temperatures through the natural process of transpiration. Transpiration releases water vapor into the air from within plant leaves, absorbing heat in the evaporation process. There are many elements of an urban open space that can contribute to the mitigation of urban heat islands including the type of open space (park or nature reserve), type of plant species, and the density of vegetation. Green spaces contribute to the reduction of local heat, decreasing the overall effect of UHIs. The larger the distribution of green spaces, the bigger the area of heat reduction. Green spaces that are clustered together will have an additive heat reduction, resulting in a greater decrease in temperature in the local area compared to surrounding areas. Beyond internal vegetation, research shows that neighboring rural land cover extending outward from an urban boundary can reduce urban heat island effects by up to 0.5 °C. A 2024 study of approximately 500 large cities worldwide found that urban green spaces had an average daytime cooling capacity of 3.6 °C in cities in the Global North, compared to 2.5 °C in the Global South during warmer seasons. The researchers associated this disparity with differences in the quantity and quality of urban green infrastructure. A 2025 study of 1,113 urban built-up areas found that building density and height can affect how well green spaces reduce heat. In many high-income regions, keeping building density below 20% was associated with better cooling efficiency.

In 2024, a systematic review described an average air temperature reduction of around 5.0 degrees Celsius for botanical gardens, 4.1 degrees Celsius for green walls, and 3.8 degrees Celsius for street trees across studies looked at for the review.

According to a review of 12 studies published in 2024, it was found that areas with many urban green spaces tend to have less illness and death due to heat compared to areas with few green spaces. This result shows the possibility that urban green spaces are helpful not only for lowering temperature, but also for protecting people's health.

==== Impacts on air quality ====
Human activity has increased air pollution in the Earth's atmosphere, and plants play an essential role in removing human-made pollutants from the air. They can reduce particulate matter (PM) concentrations by intercepting it on leaves or other plant surfaces, and convert CO_{2} into oxygen through photosynthesis. In urban green spaces, trees filter out man-made pollutants. Air quality data collected on cities with and without urban green space has shown that areas with an abundance of trees have considerably less air pollutants, e.g. O_{3}, PM_{10}, NO_{2}, SO_{2}, and CO. As air pollutants accumulate in the atmosphere, vulnerable populations, such as children, may suffer from increased incidences of respiratory disease. Particulate matter or particle pollution with a diameter of 10 microns (PM10) or 2.5 microns (PM2.5) is associated with heart diseases and respiratory diseases including lung cancer.

Globally, particulate matter has increased over 28% in indoor air and 35% in outdoor air. Children spend most of their time at school, around 10 hours daily, and the indoor and outdoor air has a large impact on their health. Schools located in urban areas have higher particulate matter than schools in rural areas. Compared with children in schools located in rural areas, children who attend schools located in industrial areas and urban cities have higher levels of urinary PAHs (polycyclic aromatic hydrocarbons) metabolites, which is linked to air pollution.

Green spaces can reduce the pollution of particulate matter by preventing distribution of particulates from pollutants or by reducing the particulate matter from traveling to other places. There is a disagreement about the association of living near green spaces or having high exposure to greenness and illness such as allergies, rhinitis, and eye and nose symptoms. Higher exposure to tree canopy and pollen was associated with a higher prevalence of rhinitis, allergic sensitization, wheezing, and asthma among children 7 years-old. More studies are needed to explain the effect of urban green spaces on children relating to air quality. These studies should take into consideration the interconnectedness of tree species, geographic areas, temperature, and other pollutant-like traffic.

=== For children and adolescents ===
==== Impacts on physical health ====
The adolescent years are important for children due to it being a time of growth, development, and instillation of habits. When children are given the opportunity to be active, they typically take advantage of it. Children with a greater access to parks and recreational facilities through urban green space have been found to be more active than children who lack access. The access to green spaces has shown an association with recreational walking, increased physical activity, and reduced sedentary time in all ages.

==== Impacts on mental health ====
Children exposed to urban green spaces have the opportunity to expend energy by interacting with their environment and other people through exercise. One study has shown that without access to urban green spaces, some children have problems with hyperactivity, peer interactions, and good conduct. Interactions with nature, animals, and peers have positive influences on child development and reduction in burnout and distress related to having ADHD Attention Deficit Hyperactivity Disorder (ADHD). With urban green space giving children the opportunity to get outside and expend energy, children are more focused in school and have a better working memory and reduced inattentiveness.

Urban green space can also improve mental health by providing children access to a community. Recreational activities and playing at the park gives children opportunities to interact with other children and develop a social circle and set of social skills. Children with a strong social network often feel socially included, promoting confidence and well-being in their everyday lives. Overall, the bonding experiences that result from urban green spaces can contribute postiviely to a child's cognitive and social development.

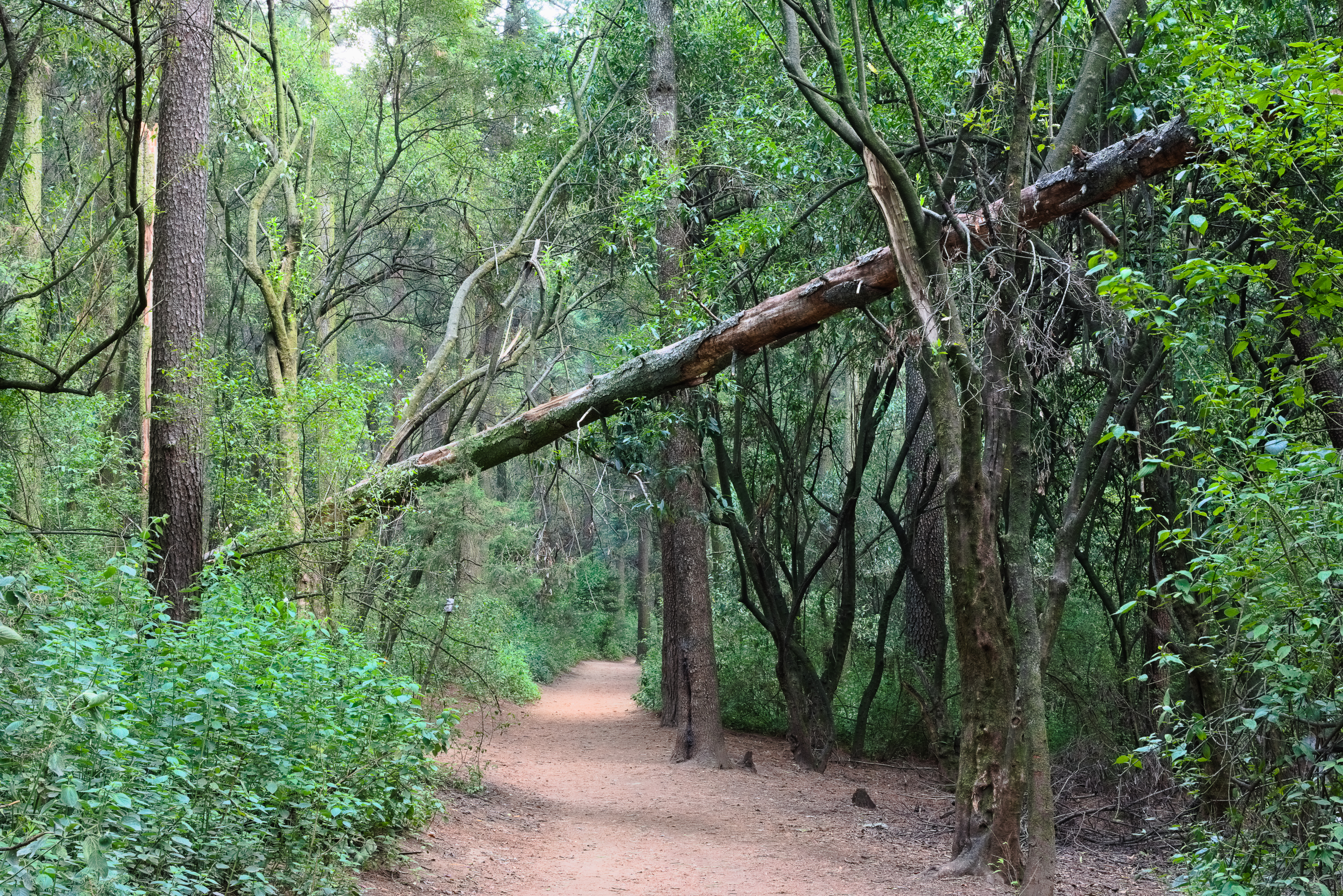
Ocotal forest, Mexico City

A 2021 study found that higher exposure to woodland urban green spaces, or urban forest, but not grassland spaces, is associated with improved cognitive development and reduced risks of mental problems for urban adolescents.

== History ==
=== Ancient Rome ===
The term "rus in urbe" meaning "country in the city" was used in Rome around the first century C.E. Urban planning in Rome valued the natural landscape and accounted for environmental factors. It was thought that by building a city with regard to the local countryside, the people living there would be healthier and happier. English landscapes would later take inspiration from Roman urban planning concepts in their own open spaces.

=== Islamic Era ===
Islamic gardens are distinctive green spaces that blend cultural, religious, and practical elements, serving as earthly representations of paradise. Typically featuring symmetrical designs, often in a four-fold pattern called chahar bagh or chahār bāgh with fountains, flowing channels, or reflective pools. Modern interpretations of Islamic gardens can be found in various locations, such as the Islamic Gardens at King's Cross in London, which showcase contemporary landscaped spaces representing the diversity of Muslim culture. The concept of Islamic gardens spread widely from Persia to Spain, North Africa, and India, influencing garden design across various Islamic empires. While maintaining core principles, these gardens often incorporated local elements and adapted to regional climate.

=== London ===
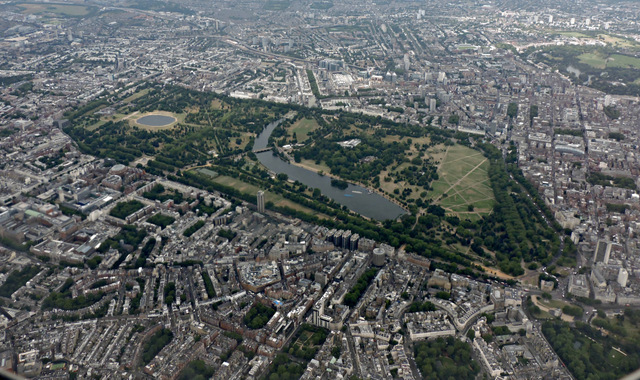
Aerial view of Hyde Park in London, England

London, England has a long history of urban open space, which has influenced development of modern parks, and is among the greenest capital cities in the world.

The basis for many urban open spaces seen today across Europe and the West began its process of development in London in the 17th and 18th centuries. What would eventually become urban open green space began as paved public plazas. Though they were intended to be open to the public, these spaces began to be re-designated as private parks around the late eighteenth century. It was during this period that the areas became pockets of green in the urban environment, commonly modeled after the natural wild of the countryside.

The first parks to reverse the trend of privatization and again be opened to the public were England's royal parks in the nineteenth century. This was done in response to the extensive and unexpected population movement from the country into cities. As a result, "the need for open space was socially and politically pressing… The problems, to which the provision of parks was expected to offer some relief, were easy to describe: overcrowding, poverty, squalor, ill-health, lack of morals and morale, and so on".

=== China ===
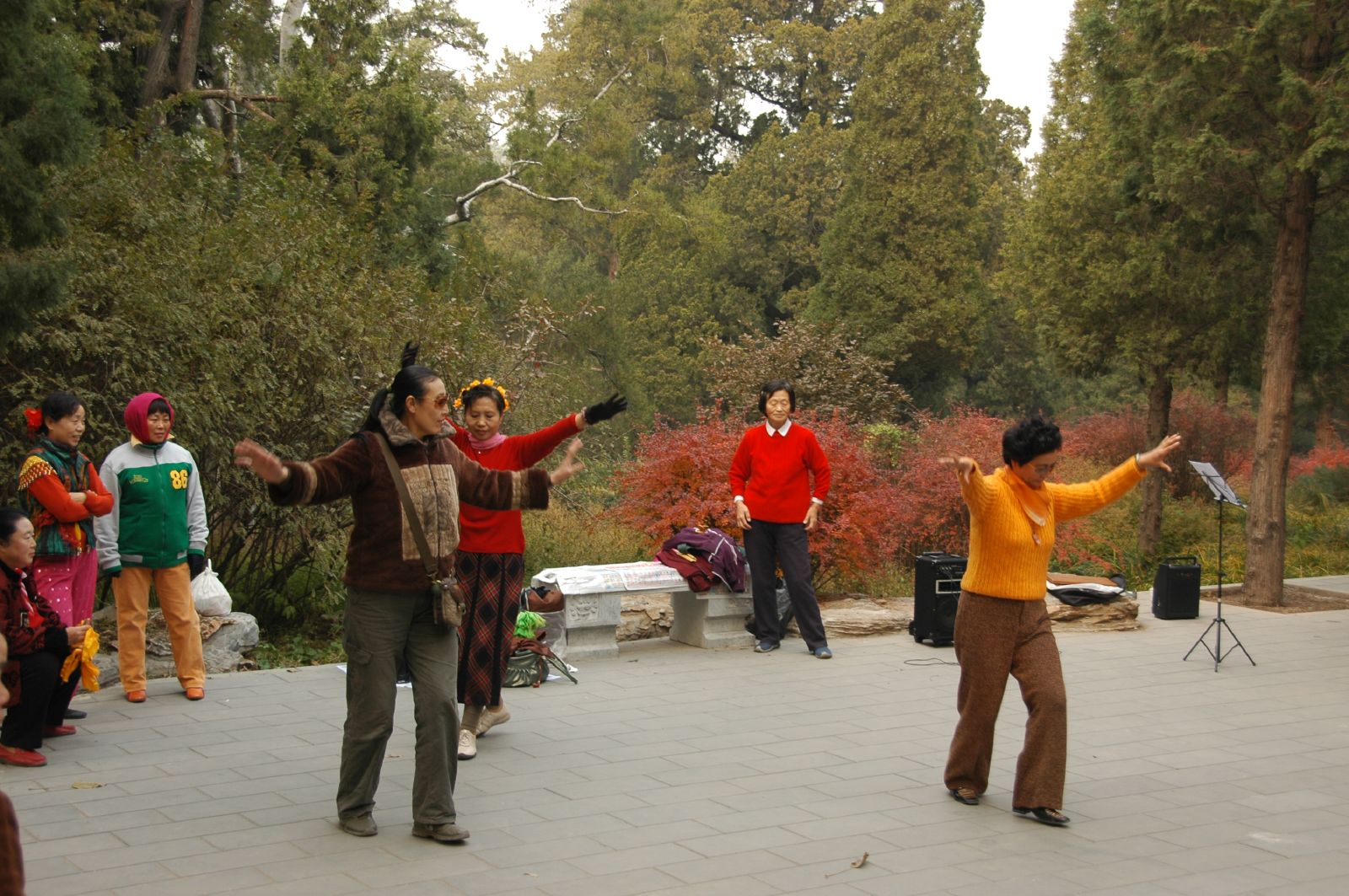
People in Jingshan Park, Beijing.

China's Fourteenth Five-Year Plan's Climate Change Special Plan emphasizes ecologically-oriented urban planning, including the use of urban green rings.

== Current trends ==
Segmentation of urban open spaces was particularly prominent in the United States during the twentieth century. Since the late 1800s romantic park systems, open space designers have been concerned with guiding, containing or separating urban growth, distributing recreation, and/or producing scenic amenity, mostly within the framework of geometric abstractions." Such segmentation was especially prominent in the 1990s, when urban open spaces took a path similar to that of parks, following the modernization trend of segmentation and specialization of areas. As modernity stressed "increased efficiency, quantifiability, predictability, and control… In concert with the additional social divisions", open spaces grew more specific in purpose.

In the 20th century, places like Scandinavia saw a proliferation of urban open spaces and began adopting a lifestyle supported by the extra urban breathing room. An example of this can be seen in Copenhagen where, in an area closed to car traffic in 1962, there developed in just a few decades a culture of public political gatherings and outdoor cafes.

Non-sustainable gardening practices, including mowing, use of chemical fertilizers, herbicides and pesticides harm green spaces. Consequently, one of the conditions for good urban open space is sustainable gardening.

At the beginning of the 21st century, studies began to show that living in areas near water (known as "blue spaces") considerably improved physical and mental health, increasing life longevity.

== Inequalities ==
Neighborhoods with higher percentages of minority residents often have lower access to open space and parks as the result of past red-lining policies and current inequities in funding priorities. Due to increasing urbanization, combined with a spatial planning policy of densification, more people face the prospect of living in less green residential environments, especially people from low economic strata. This may cause environmental inequality with regard to the distribution of (access) to public green space. The parks that do exist in minority neighborhoods are often small (with lower acreage per person than parks in majority ethnicity neighborhoods), not well maintained, unsafe, or are otherwise ill-suited for community needs. A large epidemiological study concluded that wealthier individuals were generally healthier than individuals with a lower income, explained by the pattern that wealthier individuals reside in areas more concentrated with green space. Urban open spaces in higher socioeconomic neighborhoods were also more likely to have trees that provided shade, a water feature (e.g. pond, lake or creek), walking and cycling paths, lighting, signage regarding dog access and signage restricting other activities as well. This difference in access has been proven, however, further study is needed to evaluate the exact health impacts. A 2024 systematic review of 41 quantitative studies concluded that neighbourhood green spaces generally have protective effects on the mental health of disadvantaged groups, and that the perceived and objective quality of green spaces is often more important than simple measures of quantity, distance, or usage.

A study conducted in Australia provided insight into how there is a correlation between community development/community safety and natural open space within the community. Open areas allow community members to engage in highly social activities and facilitate the expansion of social networks and friendship development. As people become more social they decrease the perceptions of fear and mistrust allowing a sense of community. Distant or absent adequate green space, therefore, may contribute to higher rates of inactivity and negative societal effects among minority populations.

=== Green gentrification ===
Environmental, ecological or green gentrification is a process in which cleaning up pollution or providing green amenities increases local property values and attracts wealthier residents to a previously polluted or disenfranchised neighbourhood. Green amenities include green spaces, parks, green roofs, gardens and green and energy efficient building materials. These initiatives can heal many environmental ills from industrialization and beautify urban landscapes. Additionally, greening is imperative for reaching a sustainable future. However, if accompanied by gentrification, these initiatives can have an ambiguous social impact. More specifically, in certain cases the introduction of green amenities might lead to (1) the physical displacement of low income households due to soaring housing costs, and/or (2) the cultural, social, and political displacement of long-time residents. First coined by Sieg et al. (2004), environmental gentrification is a relatively new concept, although it can be considered as a new hybrid of the older and wider topics of gentrification and environmental justice. Social implications of greening projects specifically with regards to housing affordability and displacement of vulnerable citizens. Greening in cities can be both healthy and just.

== See also ==
- Blue space – Areas dominated by surface waterbodies
- Dark infrastructure – Areas of low artificial light
- Eco-cities – Human settlement closely modeled on natural ecosystems
- Green belt – Largely undeveloped, wild, or agricultural land surrounding urban areas
- Green track – Railway trackbed planted with grass or other vegetation
- Greening – Process of incorporating more environmentally friendly behaviors or systems
- Greenway (landscape) – Shared-use path or linear park with vegetation
  - Linear park – Long strip of naturally occurring land for recreation
  - Rail trail – Former railway trackbeds now used as recreational trails
- Open space reserve – Conserved land or water
- Park – Area of naturally occurring land set aside for visitor enjoyment and other purposes
- Particulates – Microscopic solid or liquid matter suspended in the Earth's atmosphere
- Principles of Intelligent Urbanism – Theory of urban planning
- Sustainable city – City designed with consideration for social, economic, and environmental impact
- Urban forest – Collection of trees within a city, town or a suburb
- Urban prairie – Vacant urban land reverted to green space
- Urban reforestation – Planting of trees in urban environments
- Urban vitality – Intensity of use of an urban area
- Village green – Common open area within a settlement
- Wildlife corridor – Connecting wild territories for animals
