= Franciscan Church, Bratislava =

Church in Bratislava, Slovakia

Coordinates: 48°08′42″N 17°06′30″E

Franciscan Church Františkánsky kostol Zvestovania Pána
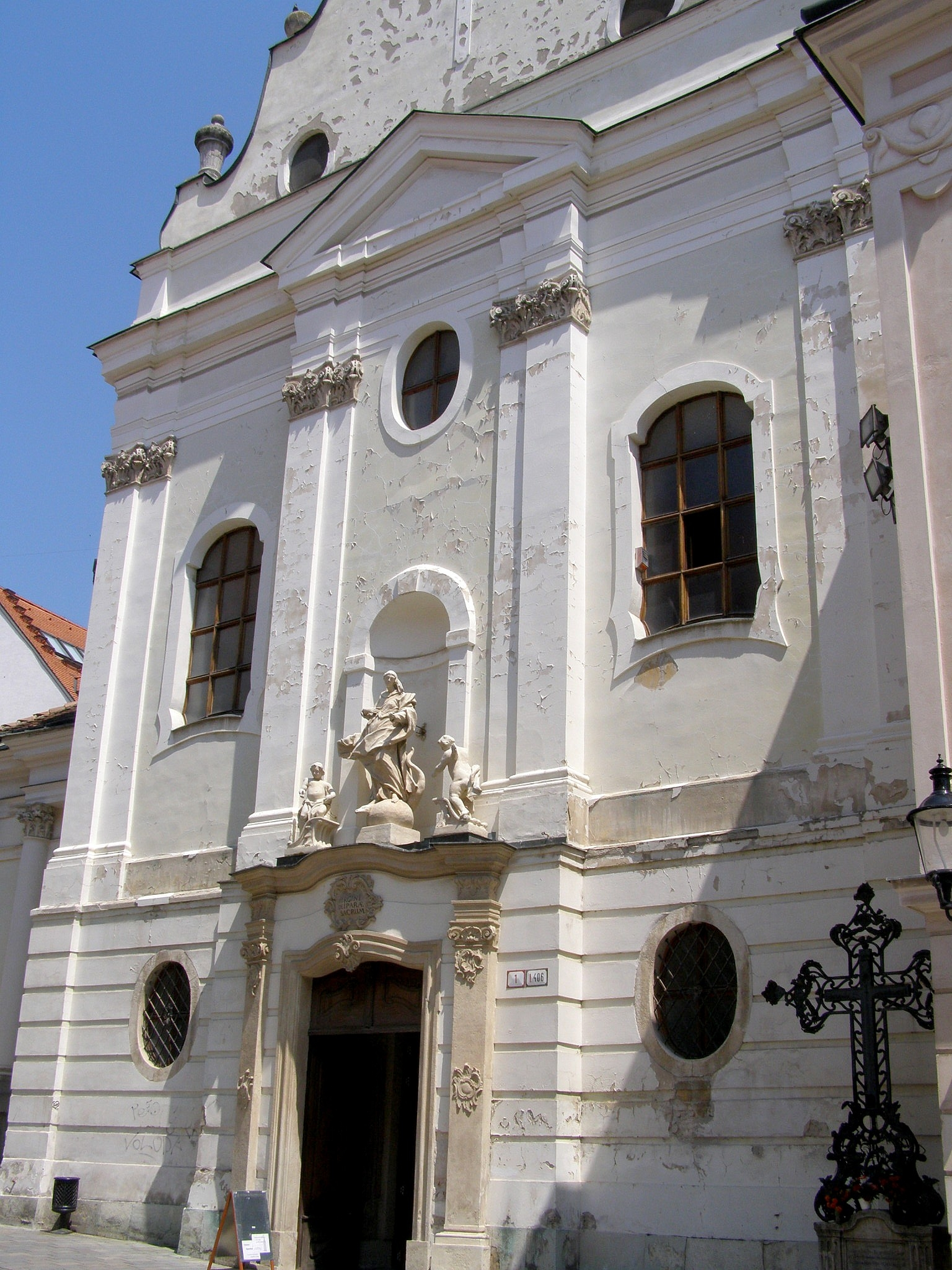
- Entrance to the Franciscan Church in Bratislava

Religion
- Affiliation: Roman Catholic
- Ecclesiastical or organisational status: Church
- Year consecrated: 1297

Location
- Location: Old Town, Bratislava, Slovakia
- Interactive map of Franciscan Church; Františkánsky kostol Zvestovania Pána

Architecture
- Completed: 1297

Website
- www.frantiskani.sk: Address: Františkánsky kostol Zvestovania Pána Františkánska Street No. 2 811 01 Bratislava; Phone No.: +421 2 544 321 45

The Franciscan Church (Slovak: Františkánsky kostol or Kostol Zvestovania Pána, Hungarian: Urunk Születésének Hírüladása – Gyümölcsoltó Boldogasszony) is the oldest existing religious (sacral) building in the Old Town of Bratislava, the capital of Slovakia. The church was consecrated in the year 1297 in the presence of King Andrew III of Hungary. In the past, the church building served for larger gatherings of townspeople or Hungarian nobles. In 1526 Ferdinand I, Holy Roman Emperor was elected here to become the King of Hungary. During coronations, kings used to knight nobles as Knights of the Order of the Golden Spur in this church.

The building was damaged several times by fire and earthquake and only a small part of its original form is preserved, most notably the presbytery. The adjacent Chapel of Saint John the Evangelist with a crypt, built in the second half of the 14th century is considered one of the finest examples of Gothic architecture in the city.

== History ==
Legend has it that the church was built by the King Ladislaus IV of Hungary to commemorate his victory over the Czech King (Přemysl) Ottokar II of Bohemia from the year 1278.

It was constructed in Bratislava (known as Pressburg / Poszony for most of its history) between 1280 and 1297 in a Gothic style and consecrated by King Andrew III on 24 March 1297. It was turned into a Renaissance church in the 17th century and into a Baroque church in the 18th century.

Selected persons were knighted here in the 16th–19th centuries as Knights of the Golden Spur, each time when kings of Royal Hungary/the Kingdom of Hungary were crowned in the Cathedral of St Martin, also located within the walled city.

Two chapels and a Franciscan monastery from the 14th century stand adjacent to the church. One of them, the St. John the Evangelist Chapel, contains a crypt of the family of Jakub, an important Mayor (Slovak: richtár) of Pressburg (Bratislava), modelled after the French Sainte Chapelle. The spacious rooms of the monastery have been used for meetings, mayoral elections and sessions of the Regional Parliament.

== Interior ==
The main altar is flanked by statues of Saint Stephan and Saint Emeric. It is a bricked pillared construction, dating 1720–1730, above which stands a glass painting from the end of the 19th century, representing the Annunciation.

Two of the side altars are dedicated to the saints Francis of Assisi and Anthony of Padua; both date from 1720 to 1730. The other side altars are dedicated to the Nativity and Our Lady of Sorrows. Leaning against the choir, one can see the altars of Saint Anne and Saint Barbara (both from about 1750).

The rococo pulpit dates from 1756. it is decorated with reliefs representing St. Francis receiving the stigmata, Saint Francis talking to the birds and Moses enforcing discipline to the Hebrews.

The rood loft, built in 1670, with the organ is supported by Tuscan pillars.

== Saint Reparat's relic ==
The church contains a relic, namely the torso of Saint Reparat, a deacon and Christian martyr from the 4th century. The relic is situated inside a purpose-built reliquary (shrine).

Saint Reparat (Slovak: Reparát) worked as a deacon in the city of Nola, near Neapoli, Italy. He died in 353, having his tongue cut out and his right hand cut off. He was buried in Rome at the cemetery of Saint Lawrence until 1769, when his body was dug out at the request of Eugen Kósa and moved to Bratislava. Today, Saint Reparat is the patron of those wanting to change their life for the better. In the past, he was also common visiting place of students of Bratislava.

== Chapel of Saint John the Evangelist ==
This chapel with a crypt was built in Gothic style in the second half of the 14th century. It was the funeral chapel of the family Jakubovec. The chapel contains statues of several saints: Francis of Assisi, Anthony of Padua, Louis IX, Clare of Assisi and Elizabeth of Hungary. The chapel is considered one of the most significant works of Gothic architecture in Slovakia. It was reconstructed in 1831.

== Picture gallery ==
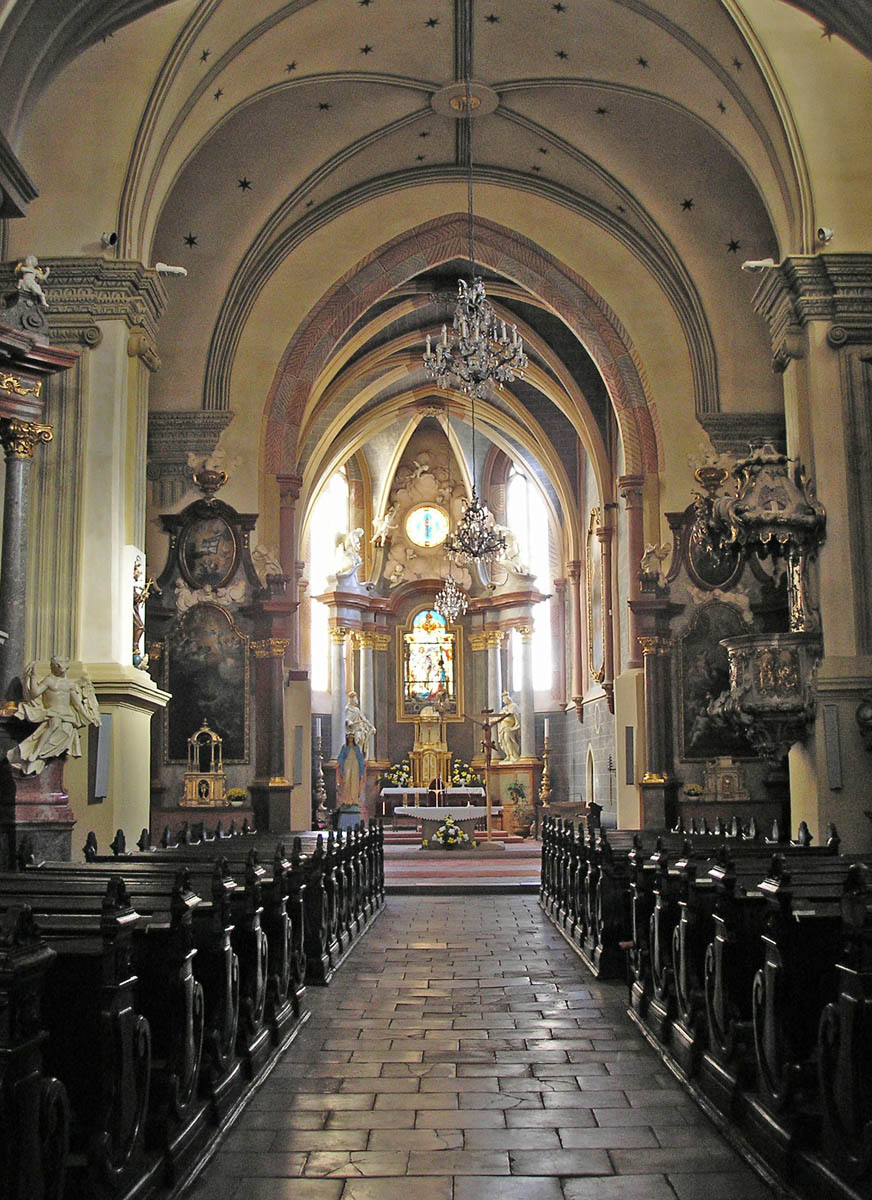
Interior

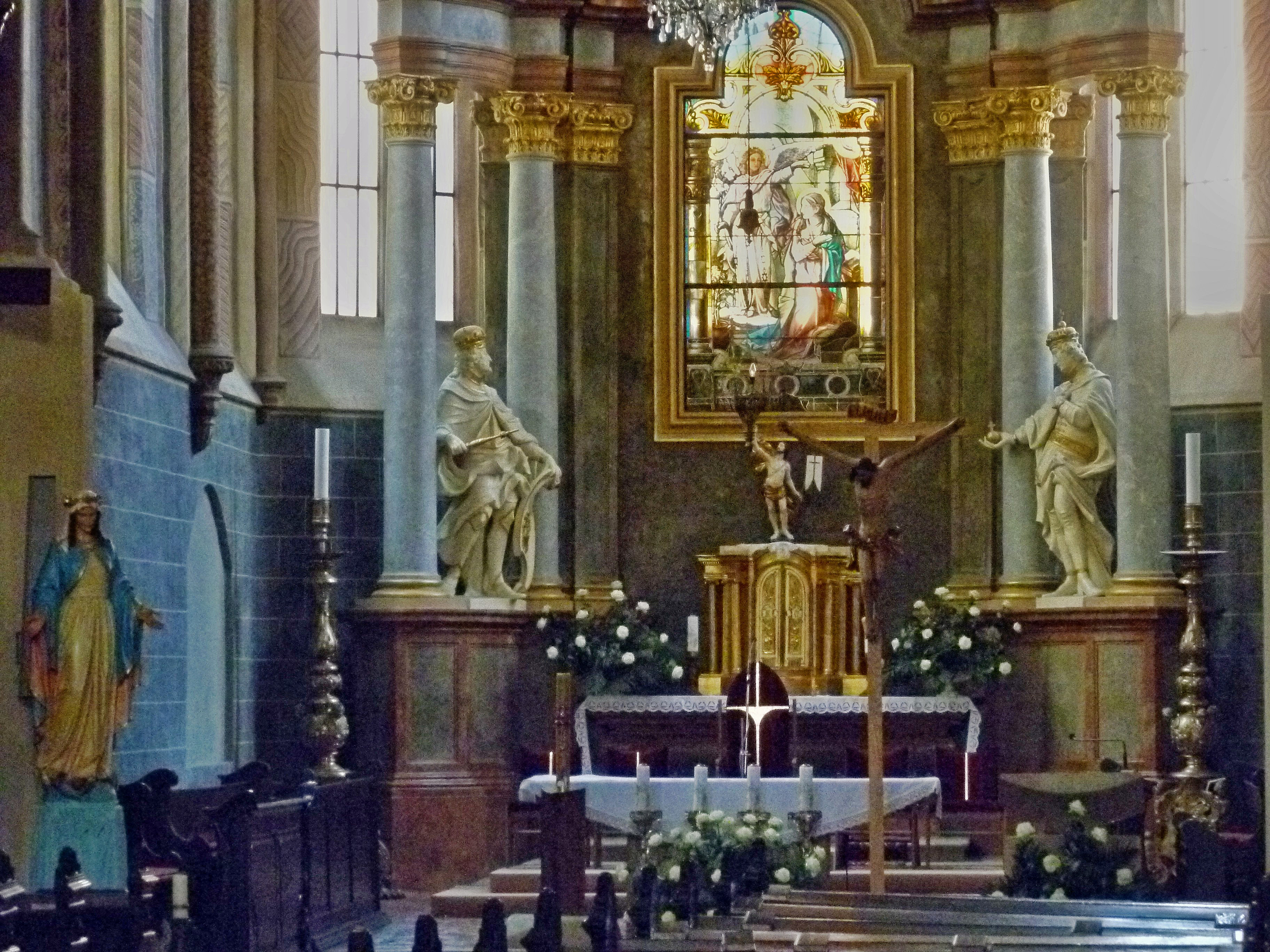
Main altar

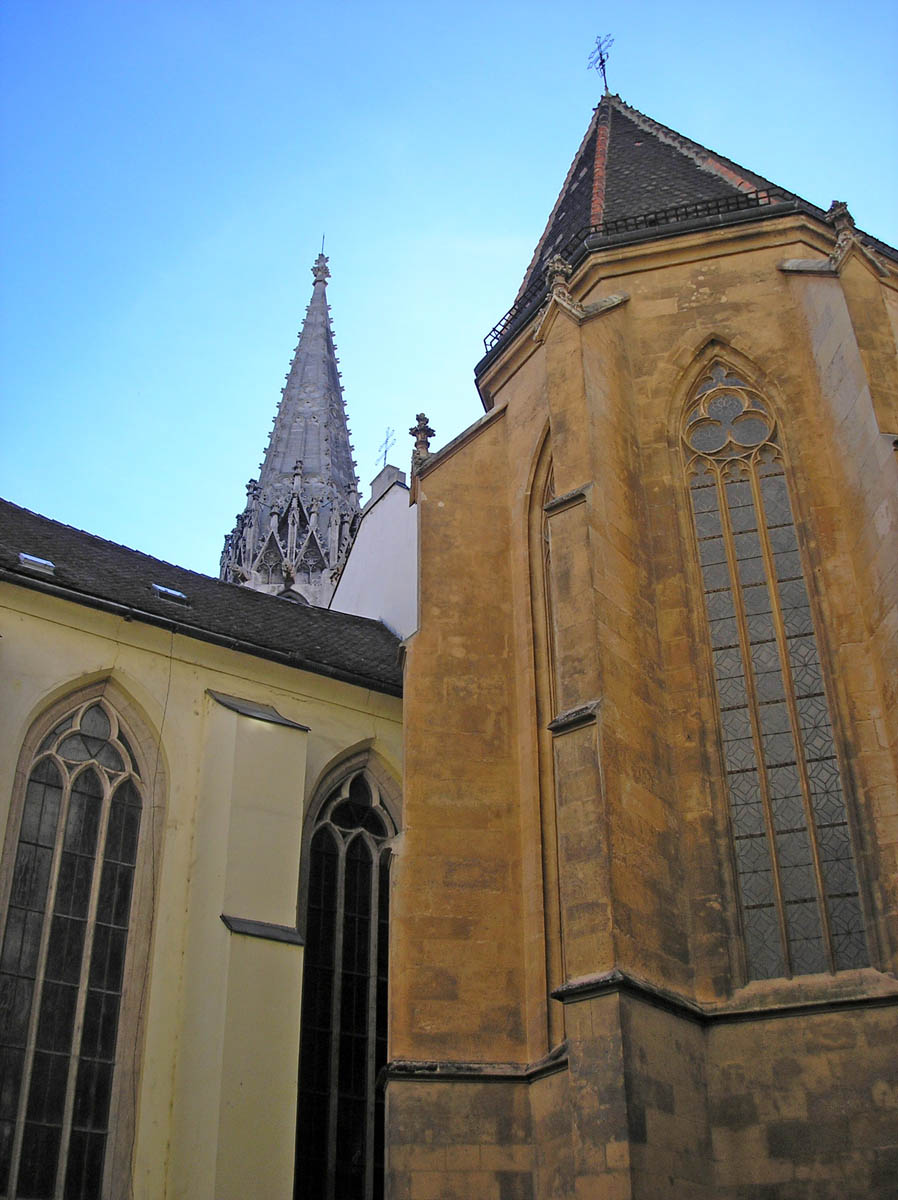
St. John the Evangelist Chapel

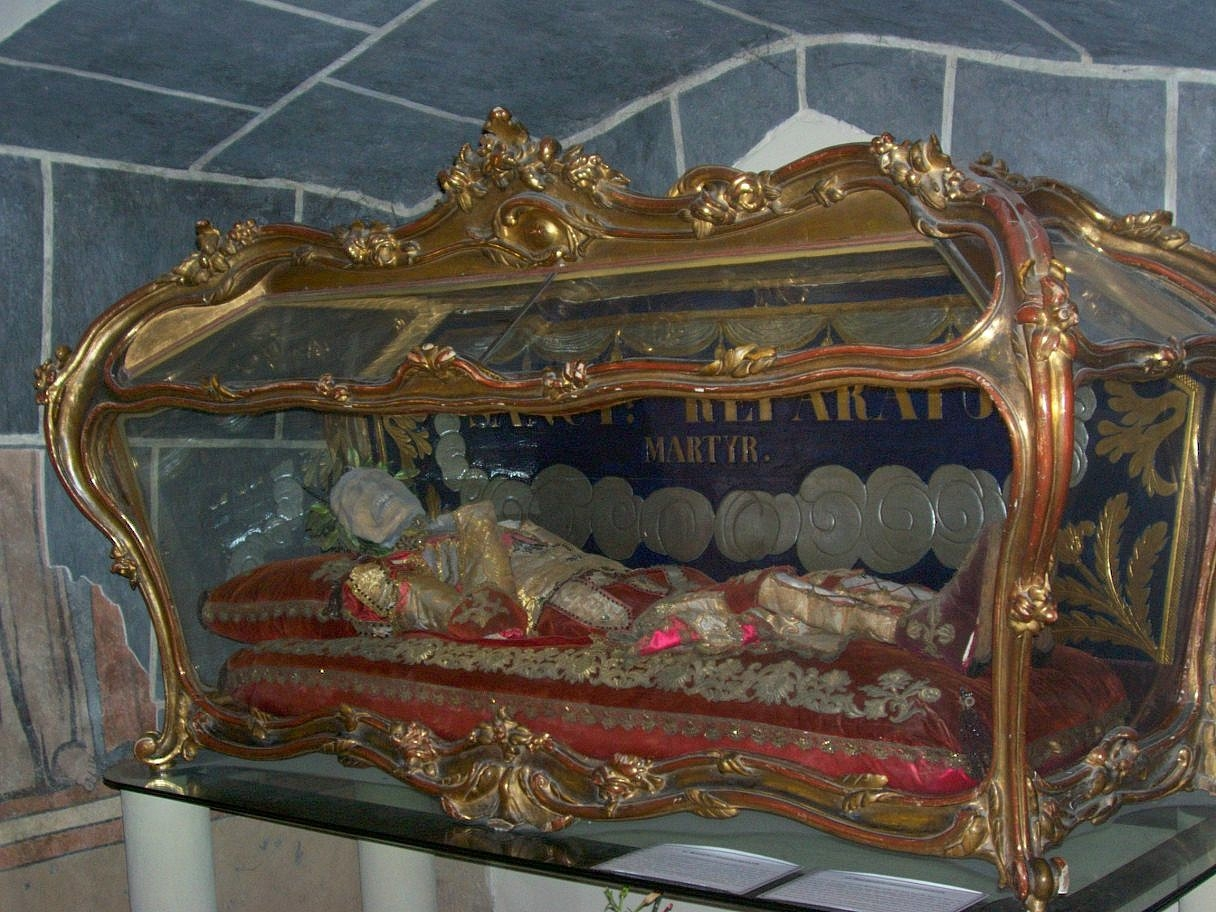
Relic of Saint Reparatus

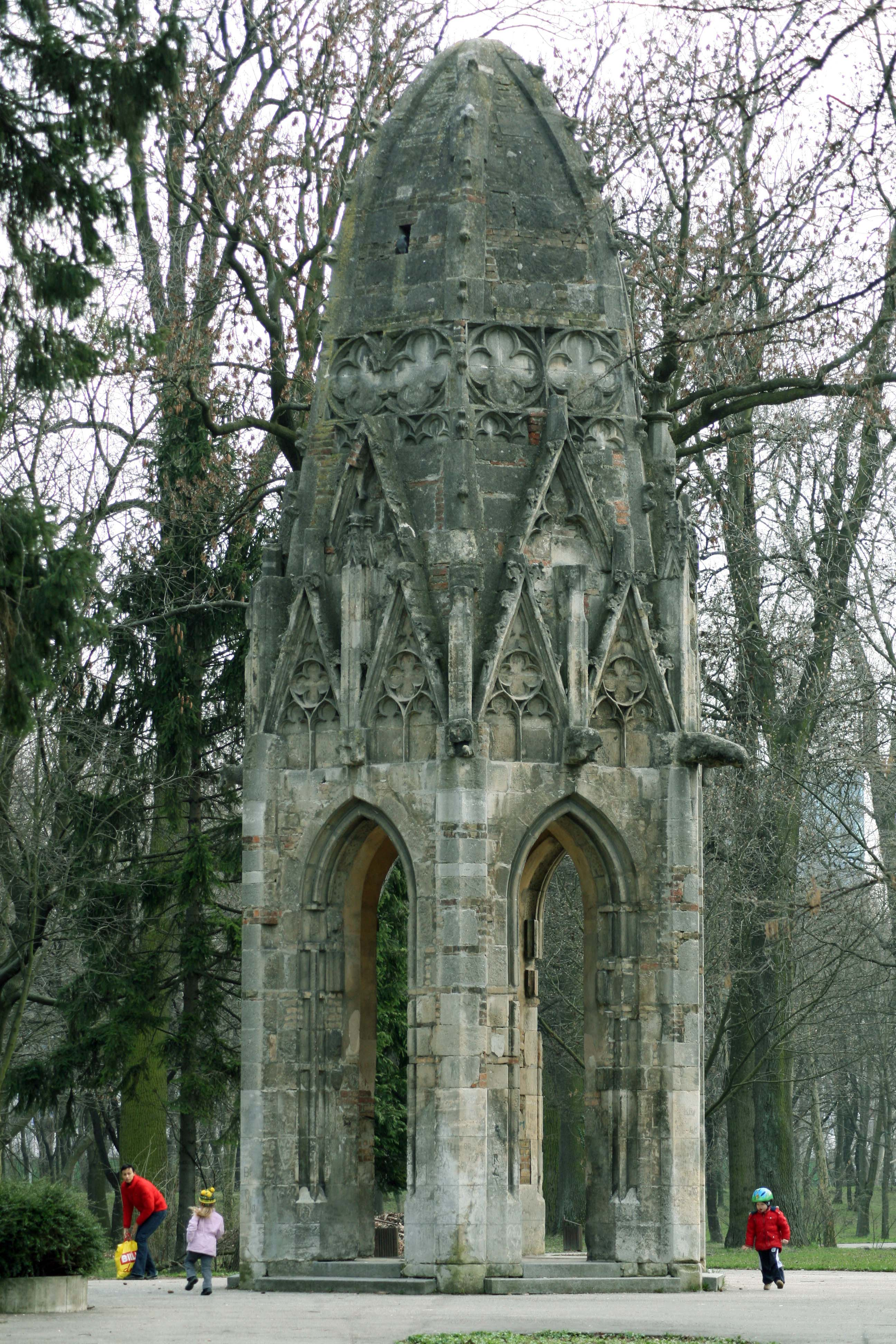
Original church tower, moved into Sad Janka Krala in 1880

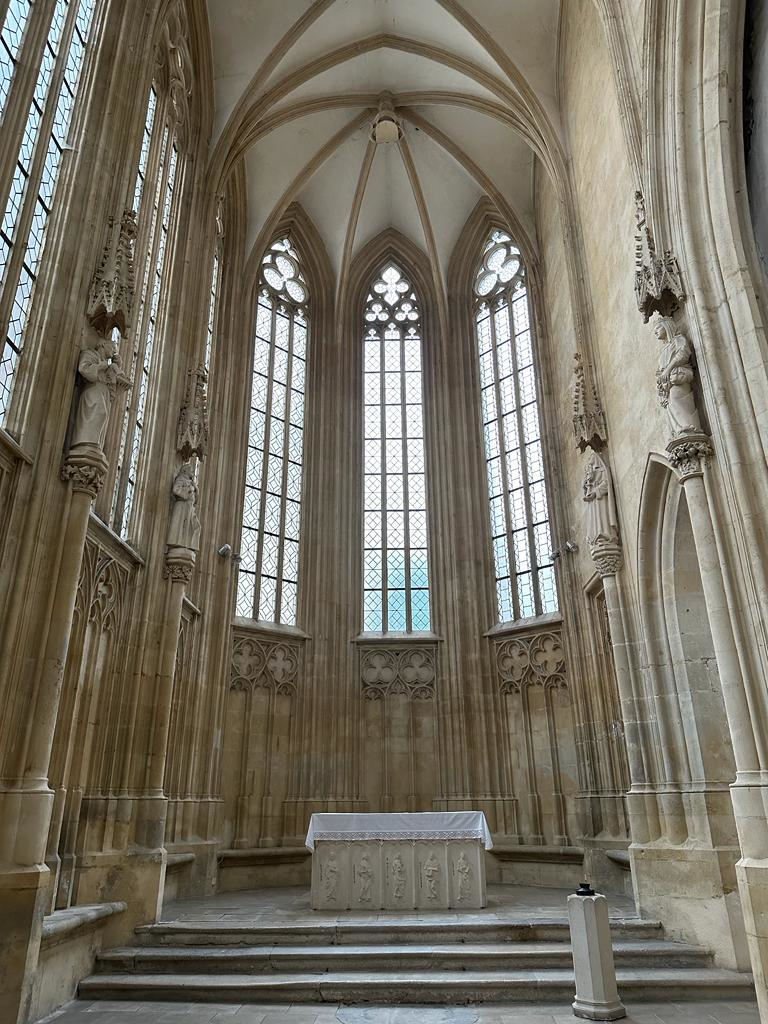
Saint John the Evangelist Chapel

== See also ==
- Franciscan order
