= Adelita (turtle) =

Satellite-tracked sea turtle in the Pacific Ocean

Adelita is the first sea turtle tracked across an ocean basin, the northern Pacific Ocean. A satellite tag was placed on Adelita, a female loggerhead sea turtle (Caretta caretta), in 1996 by marine biologist Wallace J. Nichols for a research project.

The Adelita tracking project provided the first proof of the trans-Pacific migration of loggerhead sea turtles. Adelita was also the first animal to swim across an ocean while being tracked by a satellite.

The 9,000 mile journey of Adelita from Mexico to Japan was featured in the PBS Nature documentary Voyage of the Lonely Turtle. The documentary follows Adelita as she returns to her birthplace in Japan to lay her eggs.

== See also ==
- Loggerhead sea turtle
- Magnetoreception
- GPS wildlife tracking
