= Blue Mind =

2014 book by Wallace J. Nichols

- Author: Wallace J. Nichols
- Language: English
- Genre: Nonfiction, self-help
- Publisher: Little, Brown and Company
- Publication date: July 22, 2014
- Media type: eBook, paperback, audio-book
- Pages: 352
- ISBN: 978-0-316-25207-2

Blue Mind: The Surprising Science That Shows How Being Near, In, On, Or Under Water Can Make You Happier, Healthier, More Connected, and Better at What You Do is a bestselling book by marine biologist Wallace J. Nichols about the effects bodies of water have on human health and well-being.

== Contents ==
The book covers "therapeutic landscapes" as they are referred to in medical literature, specifically ones that are near, in, or on the water. The book analyzes studies that suggest living or simply being near bodies of water can have powerful psychological and even physiological effects.

=== Human condition ===
Blue Mind considers the impact of water on the human condition and mental health. Author Wallace Nichols told Quartz:

People can experience the benefits of the water whether they're near the ocean, a lake, river, swimming pool or even listening to the soothing sound of a fountain. Most communities are built near bodies of water not just for practical reasons, but because as humans, we're naturally drawn to blue space...but even if you aren't in an area where there is easy access to water, you can still experience [its] emotional benefits. Many scribes, poets, painters, and sailors have attested to the feeling of wellness and peace that comes over them when they're in, or near, bodies of water.

=== Research ===
Blue Mind compiles and analyzes recent scientific research that has shown water's favorable cognitive and physical impacts being quantified by experts. The book shows proof that living near the shore, for example, has been shown to boost physical health and well-being. It also provides evidence that water generates a meditative state, which makes us happier, healthier, calmer, and more creative.

== Reception ==
The book was received well by critics, and made The New York Times Best Seller list. A review from The Guardian labeled Blue Mind "popular psychology", calling it "a study in water and why it makes us happy". A review from the Association for the Sciences of Limnology and Oceanography said "Blue Mind is an interesting read and presents a different perspective on water than we typically think about during the course of our hectic days."
