= Janko Kráľ =

Slovak poet

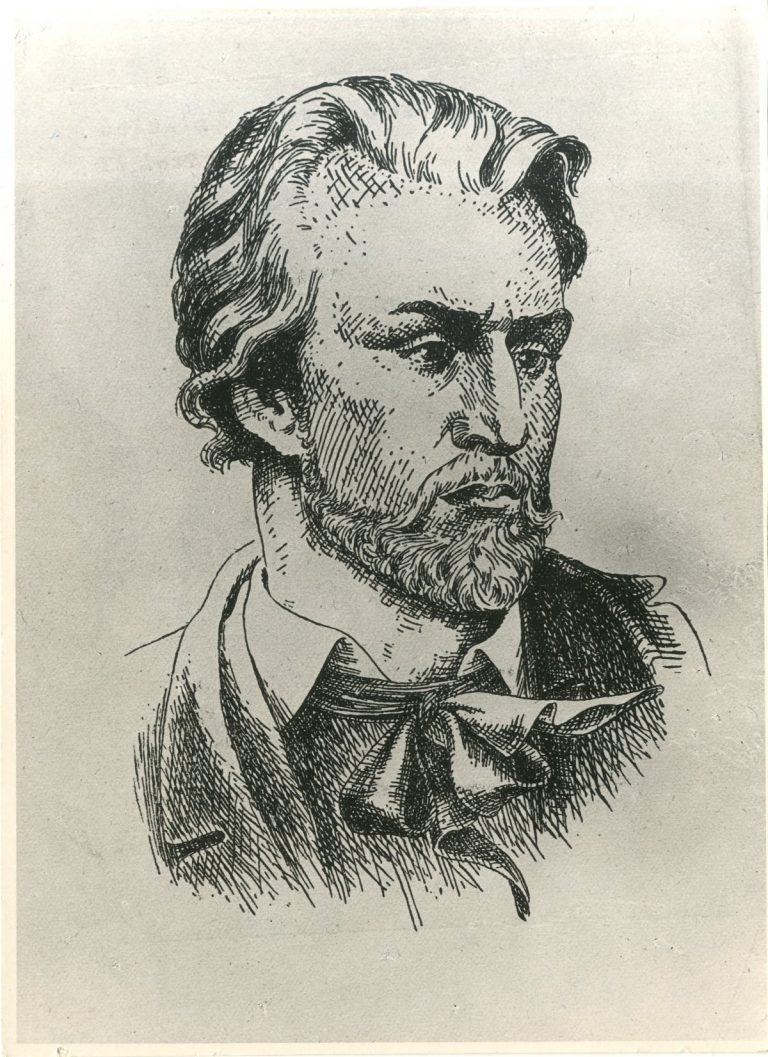
Janko Kráľ

Janko Kráľ (Hungarian: Král János; 24 April 1822 in Liptovský Svätý Mikuláš – 23 May 1876 in Zlaté Moravce) was a Slovak poet and national activist. He was one of the most significant and most radical Slovak romantic poets of the Ľudovít Štúr generation.

Because of his obscure personality, it is not known exactly what he looked like, but several more or less popular supposed pictures of him exist. One of them was used as a model for the statue of Janko Kráľ located in a park called Sad Janka Kráľa (literally Janko Kráľ Orchard) in Bratislava-Petržalka. He is buried in the National Cemetery in Martin.

He was one of the first poets to start writing in the modern Slovak language standard freshly codified (in 1843) by Ľudovít Štúr and his companions. There is a school with his name, Gymnázium Janka Kráľa, located in Zlaté Moravce.

== Works ==
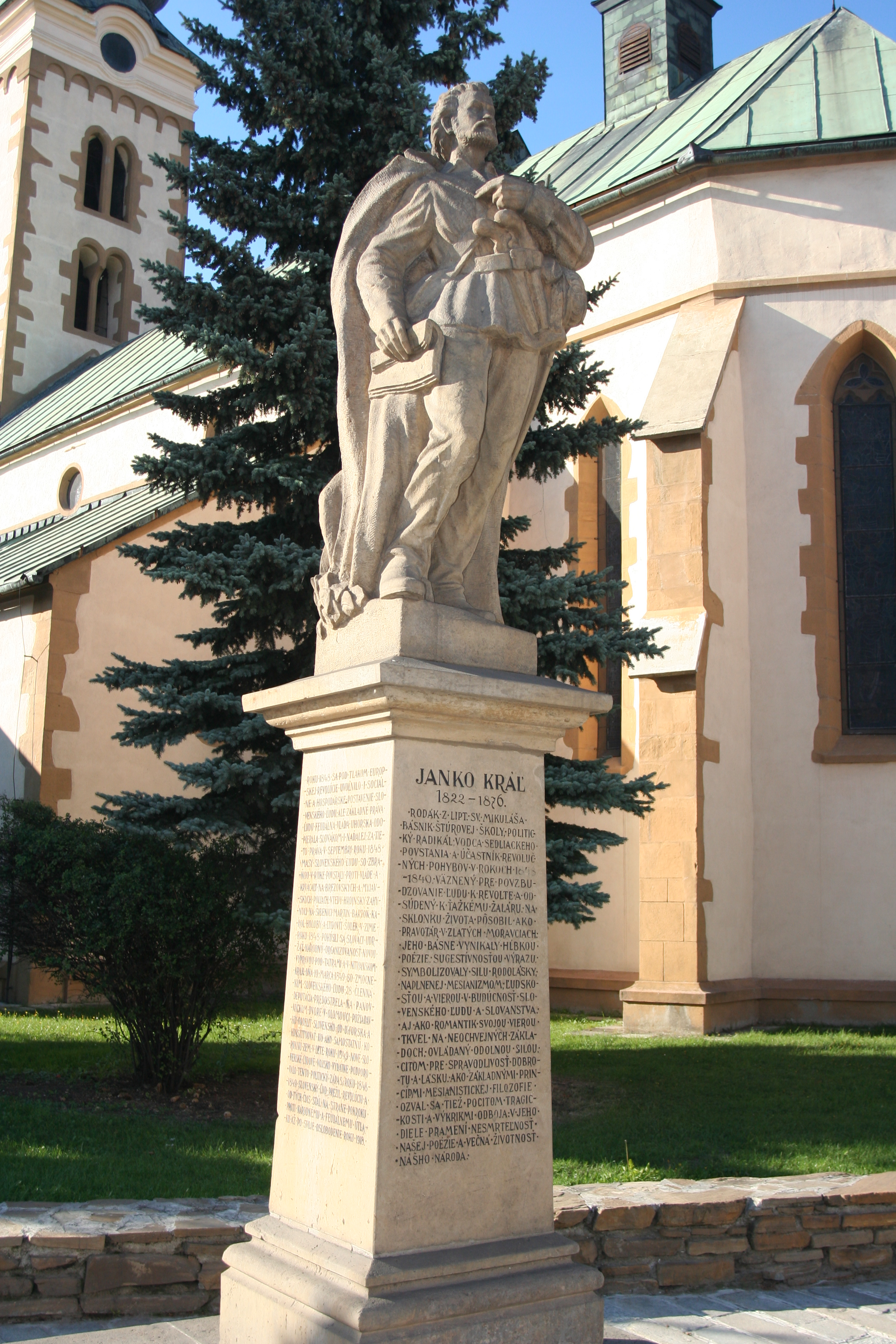
Janko Kráľ's monument in Liptovský Mikuláš

- Zverbovaný
- Zabitý
- Zakliata panna vo Váhu a divný Janko
- Moja pieseň
- Pieseň bez mena
- Orol
- Piesne
- Potecha
- Pán v trní
- Pieseň
- Duma bratislavská
- Kríž a čiapka
- Choč
- Krajinská pieseň
- Slovo
- Duma slovenská
- Krakoviaky dobrovoľníkove
- Jarná Pieseň
