= Janko Kráľ Park =

Park in Bratislava, Slovakia

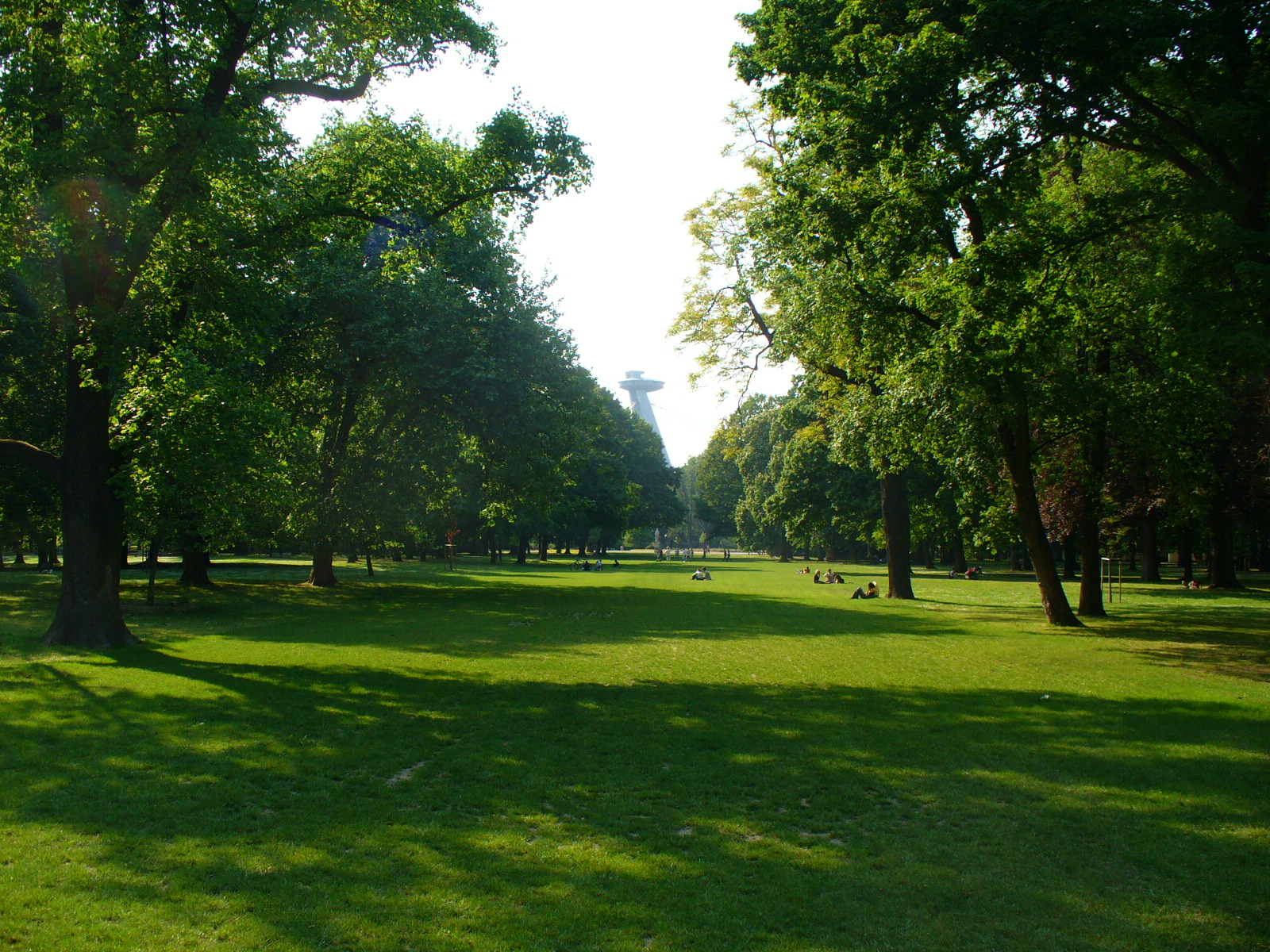
- Landscape in Janko Kráľ Park
- Interactive map of Janko Kráľ Park
- Type: Municipal
- Location: Petržalka
- Coordinates: 48°08′05″N 17°06′45″E
- Status: Open all year

Janko Kráľ Park (Slovak: Sad Janka Kráľa, literally Janko Kráľ Orchard/Garden; formerly called Städtischer Aupark (in German), is a park in Bratislava's Petržalka borough. It is located in the northern part of Petržalka, bordered by the Danube in the north, the Old Bridge access road in the east, a main road in the south and the Nový Most access road in the west. The park is one of the oldest municipal parks in Europe. The statue of Janko Kráľ is situated in the park.

The park was established in 1774–76 with the intention of creating a park for the public. Under the influence of Baroque classicism, the walks were set up in the shape of an eight-leg star and trees were planted along them. Each allée was named after its corresponding species of tree (alder, maple, willow, etc.). The park attained its present-day shape in 1839, and was revamped in the 1970s.

The Petržalka Stadium, home to the FC Artmedia Bratislava football club, was located near the park, before its demolition in 2012. The Arena Theatre is also located nearby.

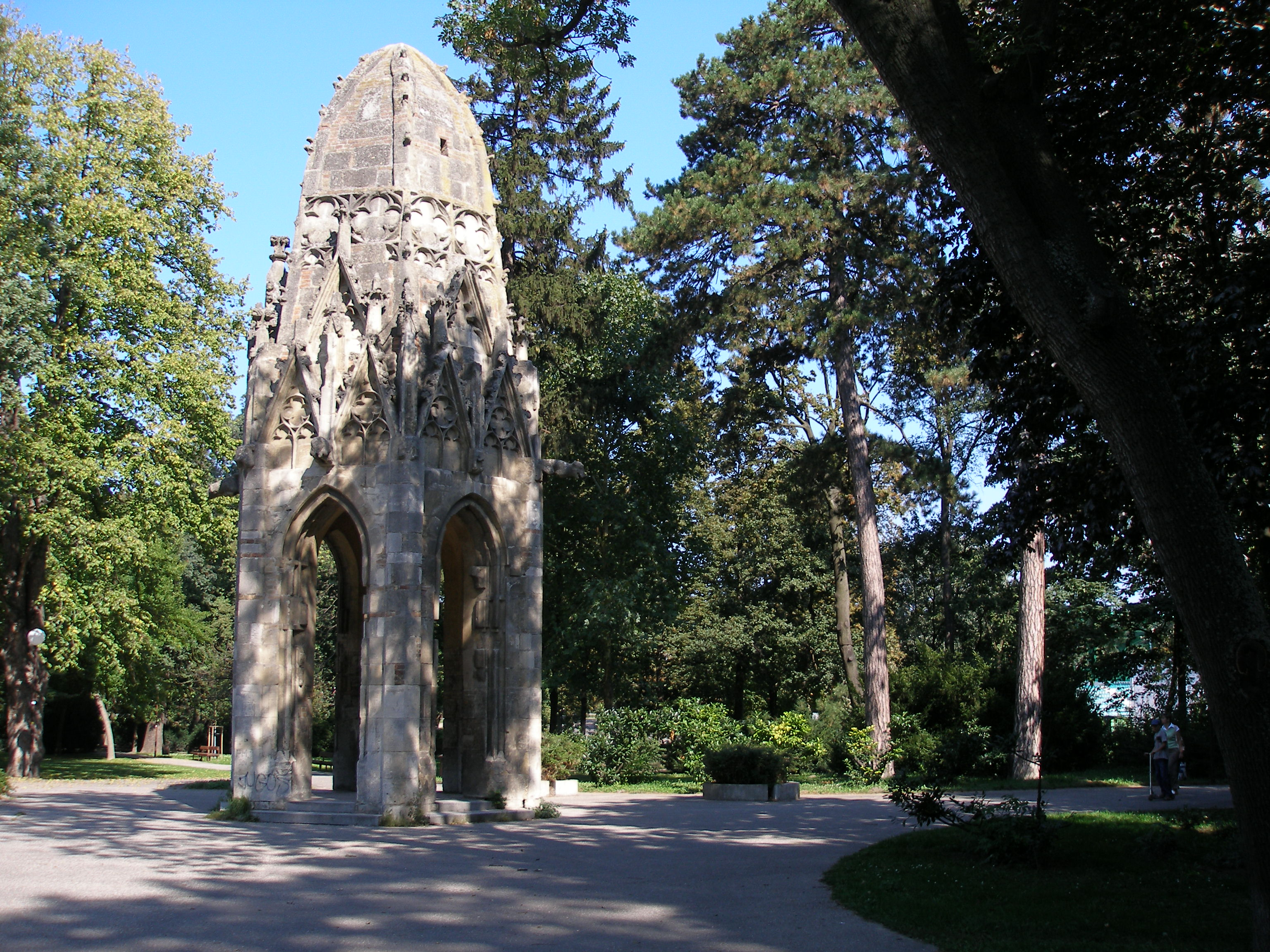
Tower

The Gothic tower (Gotická veža) is the prominent architectural structure in Janko Kráľ Park. It is the primary garden arbour and was previously a Franciscan church tower.

This Gothic tower was built in the early 15th century at the intersection of the South facing Franciscan church: carved by Michael Chnam. In 1897, an earthquake damaged the upper part of the tower, requiring that it be rebuilt, which was done in a Neogothic style by project architect Frigyes Schulek. The original top of the tower, after the earthquake, was placed in Janko Kráľ Park, where it is now an arbour.

== See also ==
- Aupark
