= Wallace J. Nichols =

American marine biologist (1967–2024)

Wallace J. Nichols (1967 – June 10, 2024) was a marine biologist who is known as the author of Blue Mind and other significant works, as well as promoting several marine improvement ventures.

He studied marine biology in the early 1990s, before completing his PhD at the University of Arizona, Tucson, where he specialized in turtle genetics, migration and conservation. He and his colleagues famously tagged a loggerhead turtle named Adelita, and tracked it by satellite as it swam from California to Japan – this was the first animal to be recorded crossing an entire ocean basin.

== Early life and education ==
Nichols was born in New York, and he graduated from Barrington High School (Illinois) in 1985. He studied biology and Spanish at DePauw University immediately after high-school, then in 1992 he obtained a master's degree in economics at Duke University. Between 1993 and 1994, he studied marine biology at Northeastern University.

He became a Fulbright Fellow and later received a Marshall Fellowship while studying at the University of Arizona, Tucson. His thesis was entitled "Biology and conservation of sea turtles in Baja California, Mexico".

== Legacy and media appearances ==
In 2025, Nichols appeared in the feature documentary The Definition of Happiness, which explores the human connection to water and emotional well-being. The film was completed shortly after his passing and was dedicated to his memory.

== Published works ==
=== Books ===
- Nichols, Wallace J. (2014). Blue Mind: How Water Makes You Happier, More Connected and Better at What You Do. Hachette UK. ISBN 9781405528092.
- Nichols, Wallace J.; Nahill, Brad; Gaskill, Melissa (2014). A worldwide travel guide to sea turtles (1st ed.). College Station: Texas A&M University Press. ISBN 9781623491741.
- Nichols, Wallace J.; Nichols, Wallace Grayce; Beckmeyer, Drew (2022). Dear Wild Child: You Carry Your Home Inside You. Petaluma, California: Cameron Kids. ISBN 9781647007874.
- Nichols, Wallace J (2024). Blue Mind: The Surprising Science That Shows How Being Near, In, On, Or Under Water Can Make You Happier, Healthier, More Connected, and Better at What You Do. Little, Brown Books for Young Readers. ISBN 9780316579902.

=== Journal articles ===
As of July 2024, Google Scholar lists 8,143 citations to his work, and calculates his h-index as 43. The most cited individual paper was "Global research priorities for sea turtles: informing management and conservation in the 21st century", published in Endangered Species Research in 2010. ResearchGate lists 69 publications with a total of 5,077 citations, while Scopus lists 35 publications with a total of 3,303 citations.

== Personal life ==
Nichols was married to Dana and had two daughters, Grayce and Julia. They lived for some years in a house they built in Santa Cruz County, California on the rugged North Coast and he was widely known for promoting the area as the "Slow Coast". But in 2020, the family's home for 20 years, just off Swanton Road, was destroyed in the CZU Lightning Complex fires.
