= Dark infrastructure =

Areas of low artificial light

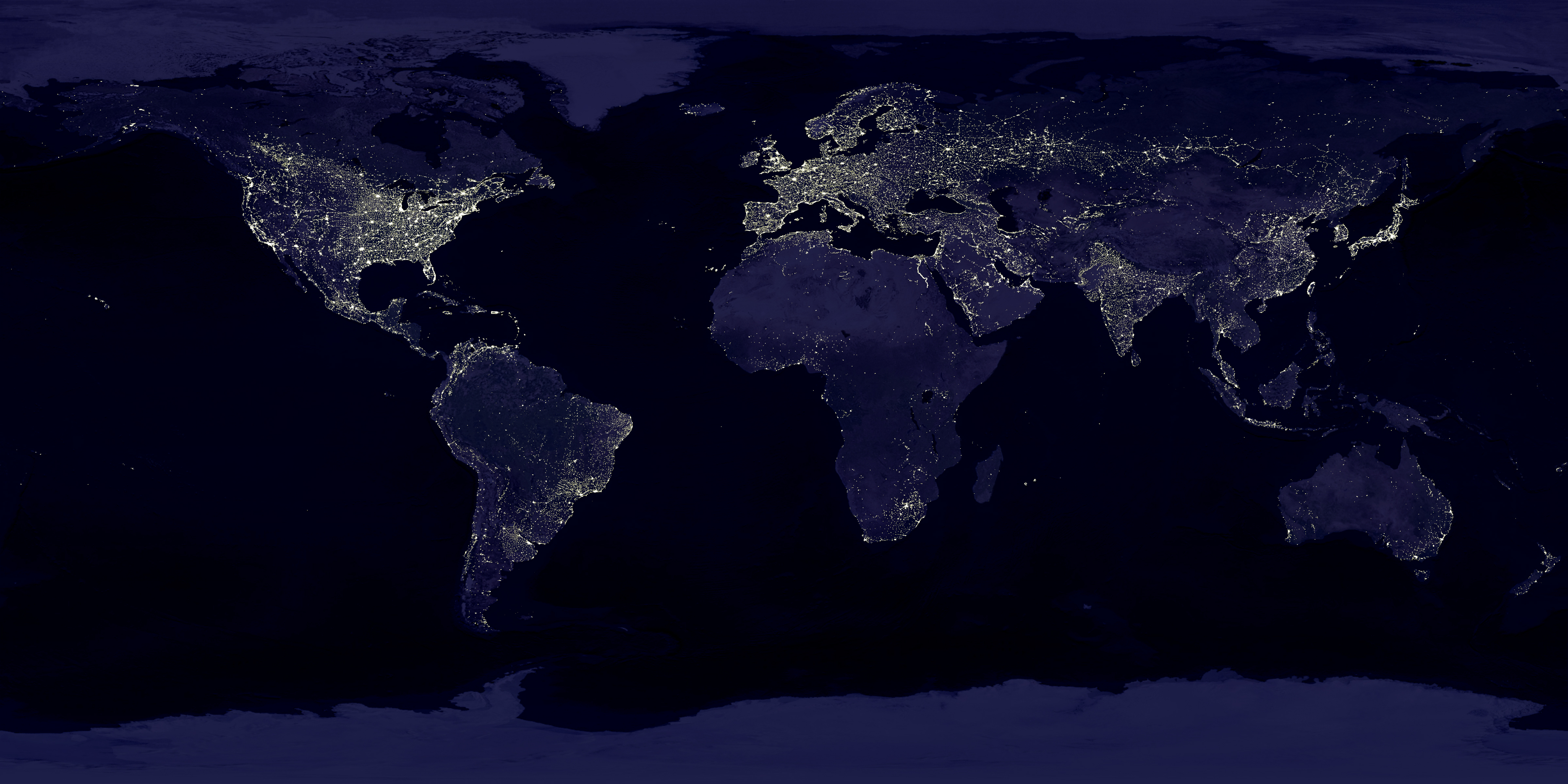
Areas of light across Earth at night

Dark infrastructure refers to interconnected networks of natural, semi-natural and urbanized spaces, characterized by low levels of artificial light at night (ALAN), that create ecological continuities in order to provide benefits such as ecological restoration, wildlife conservation, and human health. Dark infrastructure aims to recognize the need for natural periods of darkness for life on Earth.

In practice, different levels of administrative agencies assess, upgrade and monitor existing areas where the environment remains sufficiently undisturbed light-wise for biodiversity to prosper. Modeled on and complementary to ecological infrastructure networks, dark infrastructure most often consists of cores of darkness connected through corridors. They are expected to sustain human and wildlife health as well as maintain ecosystem services in urban areas.

Some cities and regions (e.g. Trame noire, Eurométropole Metz) in France, Switzerland (e.g. Trame noire and Plan Lumière, Geneva) and the United States have adopted this approach. Some cities in Normandie have since rescinded their plan.

Several western countries have seen the emergence of dark-sky movements, which focus on the human benefits of experiencing starry night skies.

The rationale is that since the Industrial Revolution, the intensity and area of artificially lit outdoor spaces has increased dramatically worldwide, disrupting natural cycles and circadian rhythms of humans and animals alike. The effects of ALAN on wildlife, human health, ecosystem services and biodiversity are widespread and severe. Through the Avoiding Barrier effect for terrestrial mammals and amphibians and the Sink/Crash barrier effect for insects and possibly birds, ALAN can further amplify habitat loss and fragmentation for many organisms.

== Adverse effects of light pollution ==
Light pollution or ALAN is known to cause harm to humans, flora and fauna alike.

=== Humans ===
For humans, this includes adverse effects on the visual system and sleep quality (e.g., by an impaired melatonin secretion, disruption of the circadian rhythm). Early-stage research also links ALAN to a higher risk of chronic diseases.

=== Fauna ===
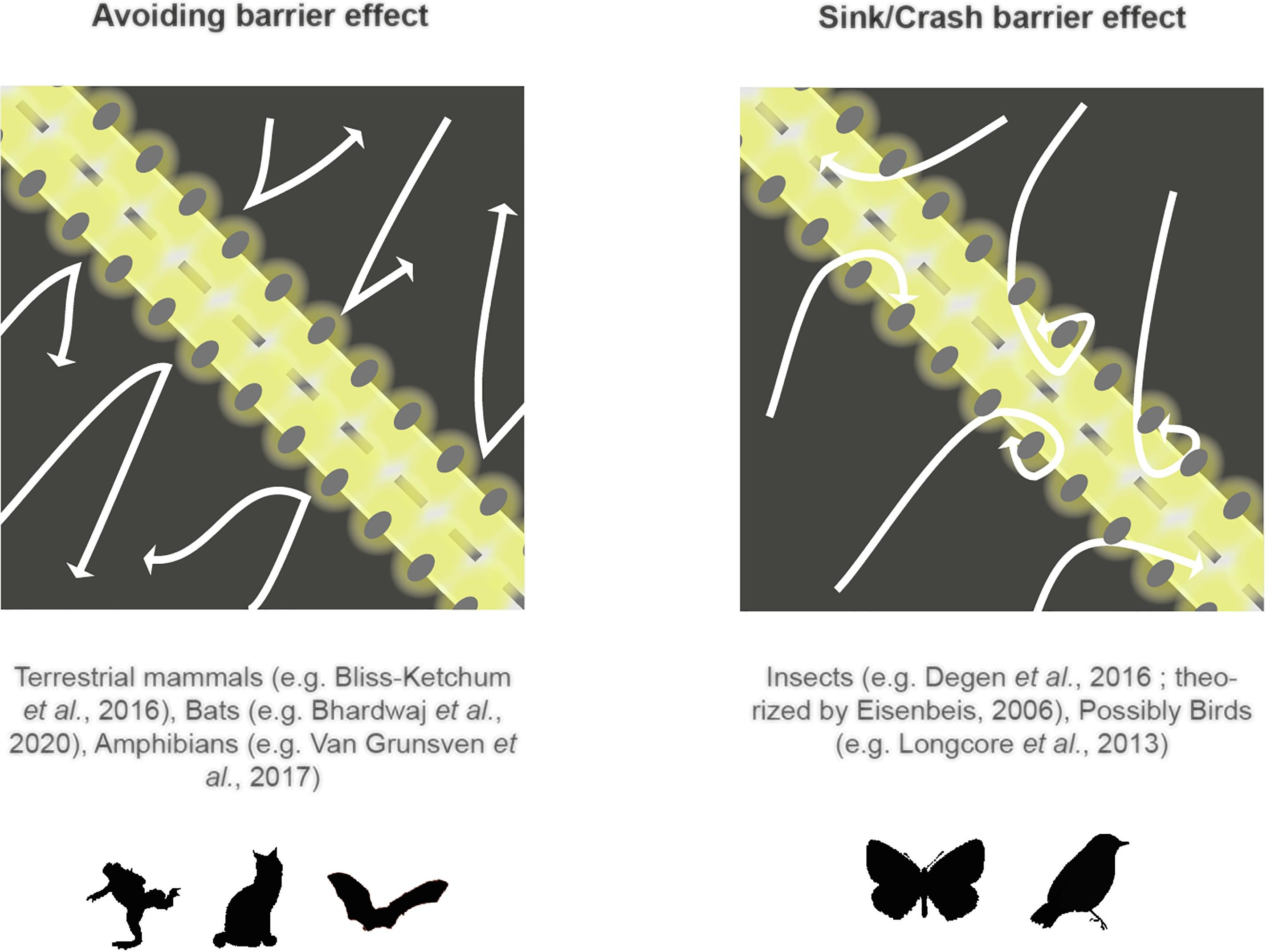
Illustration of artificial light corridor effect on the behavior of different taxa

ALAN has been linked as one of the causes of the collapse of insect populations which is happening around the world. The skyglow caused by ALAN can sometimes cover areas of over ten to hundreds of kilometers, even affecting animals in unpopulated areas and protected habitats. One problem of the additional light exposure during the night is the disruption of the circadian rhythm and associated risks similar to humans. Another issue arising from ALAN for animals in the sense that lit areas act as barriers that some animals cannot cross. They either avoid the light barrier altogether (bats, some mammals) (see Image, left) or are attracted by the light and enter the lit area, leading to entrapment inside and possibly death (see Image, right). This can subsequently lead to habitat loss and segmentation, reduces available resources, increases competition and can change predation. All artificial light at night that exceeds the equivalent of that of naturally occurring moonlight lunar phase has negative effects on physiology, behavior, and life-history traits.

=== Flora ===
The impact of ALAN on plants has been studied less than on animals. Plant leaf functions and resource-management strategies can be affected negatively as well as resource acquisition rate and disrupt the circadian rhythm and circannual cycle. Aquatic ecosystems close to the coast/shoreline are particularly exposed, since lit infrastructure/urban development are located along rivers, lakes, and sea shores.

Overall, ALAN acts as a pressure for biodiversity, especially contributing to habitat loss and landscape fragmentation.

== Implementation and methods ==
In a notable article published in 2022, an international group of scientists have called to "promote the integration of darkness quality within the 'green and blue infrastructure', to implement a 'dark infrastructure'" and proposed a 4 step-process. They proposed that first the light pollution of the given territory must be quantified and mapped. Second, existing dark infrastructure, or areas where nighttime darkness is already maintained at an optimal level for wildlife, must be identified. Third, this dark infrastructure is to be preserved to prevent further light pollution and restored or expanded upon in areas where the lighting can be modified to increase darkness. Fourth, the infrastructure must be monitored and assessed for effectiveness.

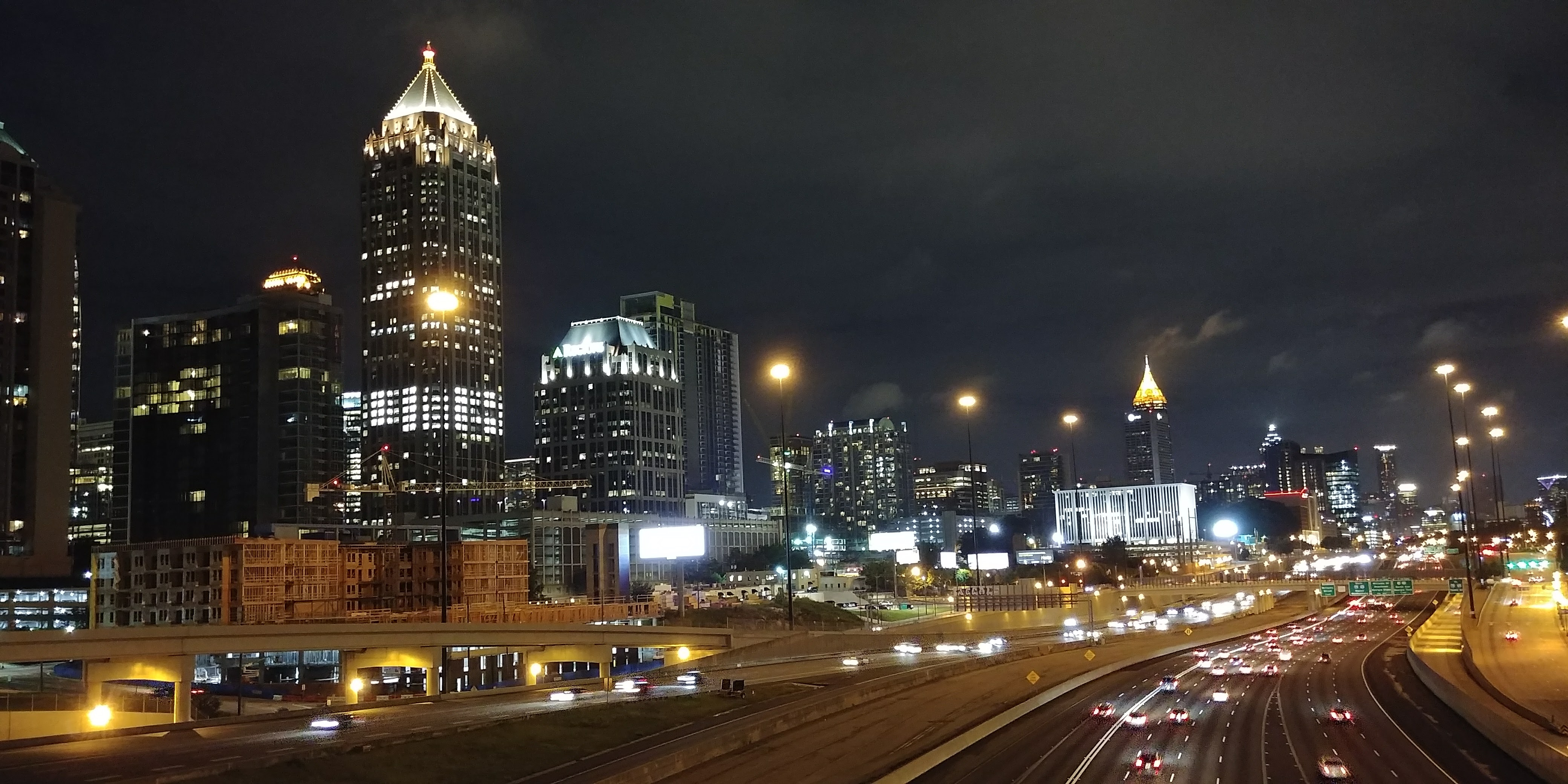
Sources of artificial light at night in Atlanta

The restoration or expansion of dark infrastructure can be carried out via the reduction of artificial lighting across several parameters, including the strength of the illumination, the timing of the lighting period, and the direction and area of the illumination, in order to maintain these cores and corridors of nighttime darkness. Light sources include street lamps, billboards, illuminated signs, car headlights, and indoor lighting that is visible through windows.

=== Methods to increase darkness include ===
- Avoiding blue light in favor of yellow light, which has been shown to generally have a lower impact on wildlife
- Diminishing the intensity of the light sources as to not exceed the natural luminosity of the full moon
- Directing light downwards
- Optimizing spacing and height of street lighting
- Maintaining dark interstitial spaces between light sources to allow for wildlife to move uninterrupted
- Utilize lighting only in places of established need and eliminate lighting when possible
- Avoid lighting in existing ecological corridors such as waterways and woodlands
- Reduce the illumination of advertising billboards, signs, and panels
- Limit the hours that illumination is active to times of necessity

=== Known projects ===
- Geneva, Switzerland, integrated ecological corridors in the Biodiversity section of their Climate Strategy. Its 2021 revision of the Lighting Plan (Plan Lumière) introduces black corridors (Trame Noire). In 2024, the metropolitan area Geneva created an open data light pollution map encompassing a "dark grid".
- Rouen, in Normandie, France, decided in 2021 to extend its public lighting optimization scheme. In 11 districts, the streets were no longer lit at night between 1 am and 5 am. A reduction in public spending as well as ecological motivation have been cited as motives by officials. A mobile-phone application called "J'allume ma rue" ("I light up my street") could be used by inhabitants in some areas to turn street lamps on when needed. Nevertheless, several municipalities of the metropolitan area have since decided to reverse course.
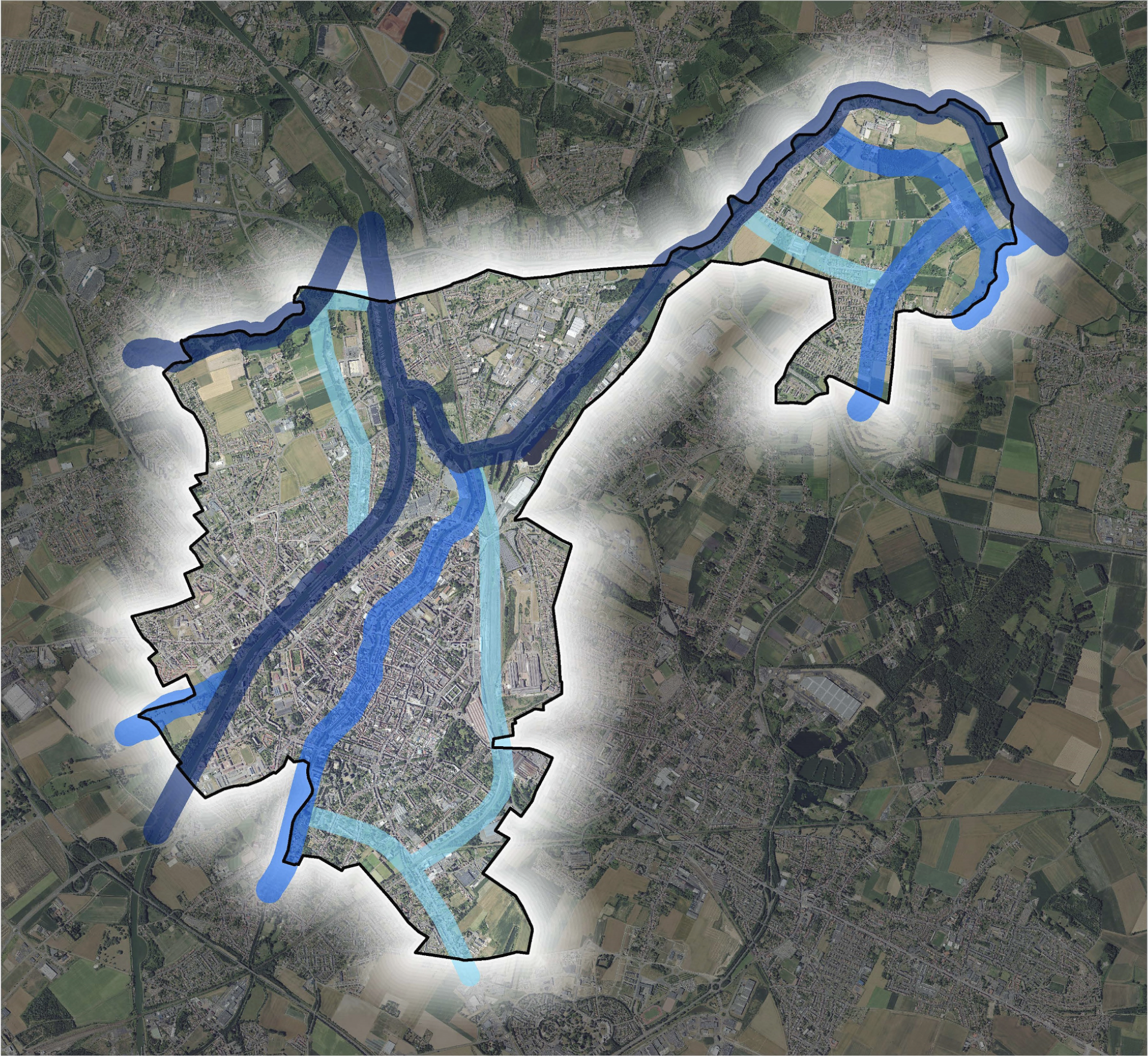
  In Douai, France, an acoustic bat survey (June 2018) identified a dark infrastructure as a network of dark ecological continuities, categorized into three levels based on bat activity intensity, guiding conservation and restoration priorities.
- Douai, France, identified previously existing dark corridors using an acoustic bat survey that monitored bat activity, which is used to prioritize areas of preservation and restoration. The survey identified pathways of low, medium, and high intensity bat activity, which correspond to corridors of darkness from least dark to darkest.
- Australia trialed glow-in-the-dark street markings in rural Victoria in 2022. The original aim was to increase road safety, but the photoluminescent markings would also eliminate the need for street lighting. New South Wales also initiated a trial of photoluminescent road markings in 2024.

== Benefits and challenges ==
Dark infrastructures have numerous ecological and human health benefits, including reduced light pollution and the preservation of nocturnal biodiversity by functioning as sanctuaries for light-sensitive species. Many species, including bats, moths, amphibians, and migratory birds, rely on darkness for critical behaviors such as foraging, mating, and navigation. Dark infrastructure helps reduce habitat fragmentation and protect pollination networks that rely on nocturnal insects. Furthermore, these corridors benefit human health by increasing sleep quality and lowering the risks associated with artificial light exposure, such as sleep disorders. Aside from health benefits, they can help lower energy consumption by reducing unnecessary lighting.

However, implementing dark infrastructure also presents numerous challenges and risks that must be carefully managed. The opinions of various stakeholders, such as society, ecology, the economy, authorities, and private interests, must be considered. One major concern is public safety, as reduced lighting may increase feelings of insecurity, potentially limiting public support for these initiatives. Insufficient lighting along roads and pedestrian paths can also increase the risk of traffic accidents, necessitating the use of adaptive lighting solutions.

From an ecological point of view, dark infrastructure may unintentionally aid in the spread of invasive species or disrupt predator–prey relationships, thereby affecting conservation objectives.

Furthermore, businesses that rely on outdoor lighting (e.g., private and commercial lighting installations) may oppose stricter regulations, and urban planning initiatives may clash with existing zoning laws.

High initial costs and the need for continuous monitoring further complicate their implementation. They require thoughtful design strategies that balance ecological preservation with urban functionality.
