= Super Bowl XLVI halftime show =

Halftime show of the 2012 Super Bowl

- Part of: Super Bowl XLVI
- Date: February 5, 2012
- Location: Indianapolis, Indiana
- Venue: Lucas Oil Stadium
- Headliner: Madonna
- Special guests: LMFAO; Nicki Minaj; M.I.A.; CeeLo Green
- Sponsors: Bridgestone
- Directors: Hamish Hamilton
- Producers: Ricky Kirshner

Super Bowl halftime show chronology
XLV (2011)	XLVI (2012)	XLVII (2013)

The Super Bowl XLVI halftime show took place on February 5, 2012, at the Lucas Oil Stadium in Indianapolis, Indiana as part of Super Bowl XLVI. It was headlined by Madonna, who became the first sole female headliner since Diana Ross in 1996. It featured guest appearances by LMFAO, Nicki Minaj, M.I.A. and CeeLo Green. Including collaborations with Cirque du Soleil, choreographer Jamie King as music director, and multimedia show producer Moment Factory, the show was critically acclaimed, becoming the second most viewed, behind the XXVII halftime show (1993), Super Bowl halftime show at the time with 114 million viewers, higher than the viewership of the game itself.

Preparations began in January, with Madonna saying that the rehearsal was the most exhausting one in which she had ever participated. Costumes were designed by Riccardo Tisci, Givenchy, Miu Miu and Prada. The production team was allotted seven minutes to set up the stage, 12 minutes for the performance and eight minutes to take down the stage. The modular structure was assembled from a truck, with a large white fabric in front as media screens for Moment Factory. Projection mapping was used by video-hardware manufacturer Barco, with films modified for the spectators and the television audience. The stadium was equipped with Sharpys lighting arrangements from Clay Paky, and the show used Sennheiser sound equipment.

Madonna was not paid for performing at the halftime show, which provides global exposure for an artist. Keith Caulfield of Billboard reported a 17-fold sales increase for Madonna's back catalog and strong preorder sales for her upcoming releases. Critics praised the show, noting Madonna's cautious performance. However, criticism and controversy was targeted at M.I.A. extending her middle finger to the camera near the end of her verse of "Give Me All Your Luvin'". The NFL apologized for its inability to blur out the image. The league later fined M.I.A. $16.6 million, which was settled in a confidential 2014 agreement.

== Synopsis ==
External videos
- Full Super Bowl XLVI halftime show – via Madonna's official YouTube channel.

The halftime show was broadcast on NBC. It began as a procession to the stage, with men dressed as gladiators pulling a large structure hidden from view by large gold-colored flags. As "Vogue" began the flags were removed, revealing Madonna in a long, gold-colored cape and an ancient-Egyptian helmet seated on a large throne. The procession reached the stage, and the singer began performing "Vogue". During the chorus, the stadium floor lit up to reveal animated Vogue magazine covers featuring Madonna. After the song, she took off her helmet. As "Vogue" segued into "Music", two large boom boxes appeared on the ground screens and the stadium handrails were lit with moving lights. Madonna and her dancers moved towards the stands. Slacklining performer Andy Lewis accompanied the singer, who danced on a tall pedestal. Madonna pretended to shoot Lewis and moved to the other end of the stage, where LMFAO sang "Party Rock Anthem" in a segue from "Music". They and Madonna danced to "Sexy and I Know It".

"Music" ended with a group of female dancers in cheerleading uniforms joining Madonna onstage for "Give Me All Your Luvin'". Nicki Minaj and M.I.A. joined her onstage, dressed in Egyptian-style clothing, and they danced as cheerleaders with pom-poms. During the song they stood on separate, elevated platforms, where Minaj and M.I.A. performed their respective verses. CeeLo Green came onstage with a marching band at the end of the song, and he and Madonna performed portions of "Open Your Heart" and "Express Yourself". "Like a Prayer" opened to a darkened stadium, with small specks of light visible, and a large choir dressed in black joined Madonna onstage. She reached the top of the bleachers and sang the final line before being pulled beneath the stage, surrounded by smoke. The show ended with "World peace" appearing on the ground screens with an image of the continents.

== Background ==
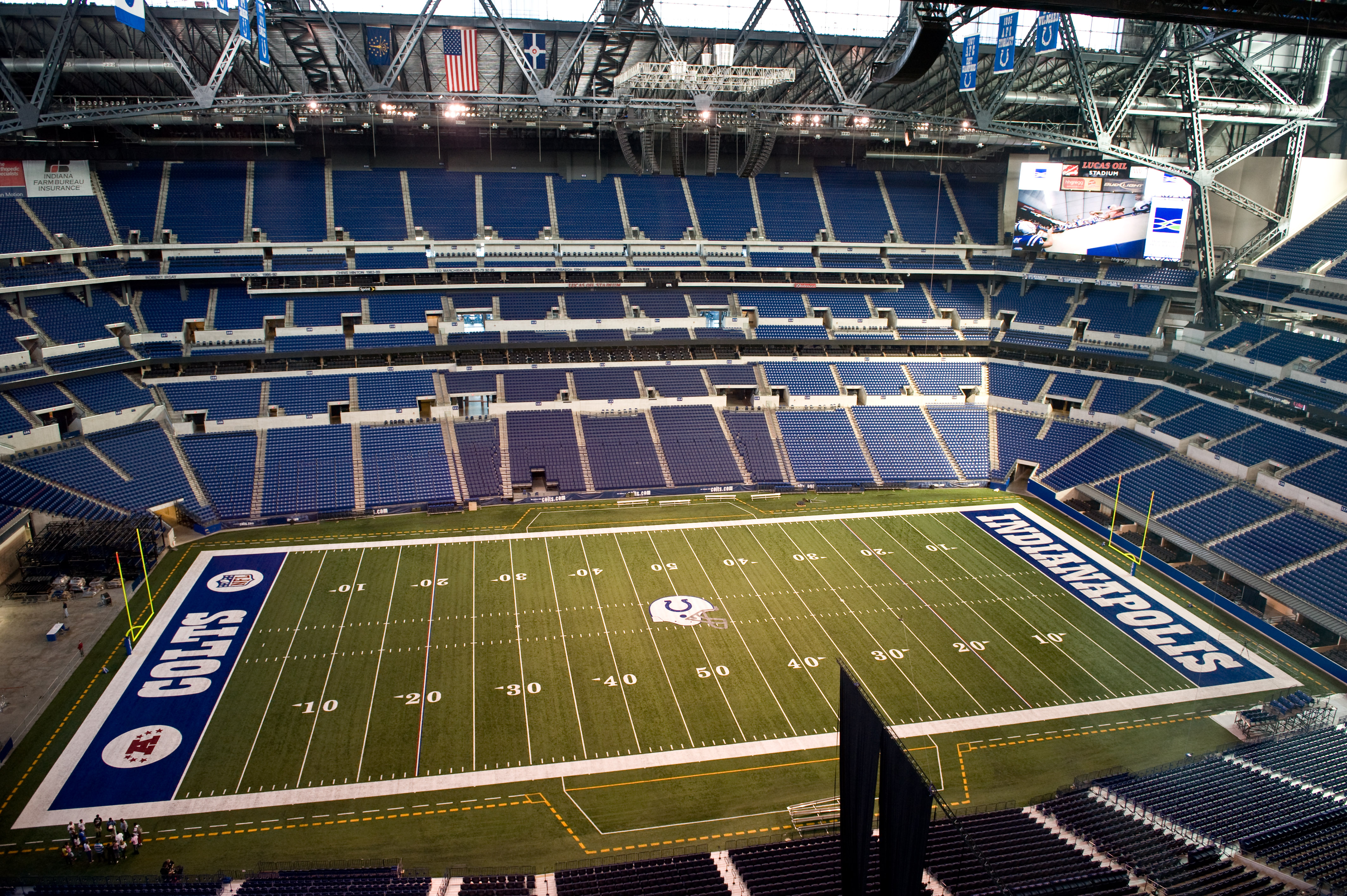
Lucas Oil Stadium, the venue for Super Bowl XLVI

According to CBS News, Madonna had been asked to perform in the 1999 and 2001 Super Bowl halftime shows but canceled both. In January 2001 she was scheduled to perform her new single, "American Pie", at the Super Bowl XXXV halftime show. However, she withdrew from the commitment due to a conflict with her recording schedule. In a statement at the time, Madonna expressed "sincere apologies" to the league and said: "I look forward to the possibility of doing something with the NFL in the future."

In late 2011 Madonna was busy with the release of her film W.E. and with recording her twelfth studio album, MDNA. The singer was reportedly signed by the NFL for the Super Bowl halftime show, and in December the league confirmed that Madonna would perform in the Super Bowl XLVI halftime show at Lucas Oil Stadium in Indianapolis. The game was scheduled for February 5, 2012, and its organizers continued their practice of inviting global musicians to perform. Artists who had previously performed in the show included the Black Eyed Peas, Bruce Springsteen, the Rolling Stones, the Who, Tom Petty and the Heartbreakers, U2, Paul McCartney and Prince. The show coincided with the release of W.E. in United States.

Madonna collaborated with Cirque du Soleil to produce the show, and her longtime choreographer Jamie King was its music director. King suggested hiring Moment Factory. The production studio, which had worked on Celine Dion's Las Vegas residency shows, specializes in multimedia effects. Jacques Methe, Cirque du Soleil executive producer for special events, said that it was "contributing to the creative process that will lead to the creation of this very special moment ... For us, it's an interesting opportunity. It's not something that we do very often, working with other stars". According to Methe, Cirque du Soleil was involved with the creative side of the halftime show and its logistical challenges. The circus had previously put together a nine-minute pregame show at the 2007 Super Bowl. "Our work has been done mostly to help magnify and create an environment for the artists", said Moment Factory executive producer Eric Fournier, citing shows in which the studio had used lighting and video projections for special effects.

== Development ==
=== Rehearsals ===
We had a lot of rehearsals — intense rehearsals. It wasn't like [Madonna] was standing there with a whip but you knew it was going to be her biggest show so I understand she was nervous.

— Nicki Minaj, on rehearsing for the show

Rehearsals began in January 2012 in a New York studio, and lasted for 12 hours. Rappers Nicki Minaj and M.I.A., who had collaborated on Madonna's single "Give Me All Your Luvin'", said that the rehearsals were "the most grueling thing [they had] ever done and wouldn't expect anything else, calling it an 'epic learning experience'". Minaj confirmed her performance in the show with a Twitter message, and rapper will.i.am confirmed that the American electronic dance music group LMFAO would also join Madonna for the event.

According to the Los Angeles Times, the NFL had coyly revealed the show's set list in its magazine: "Though Madonna's set list was not officially announced at press time, fans might expect her to give all her luvin', provide a ray of light and be in vogue with her music". Before the show, Madonna expressed concern about the physical and time constraints of the event. "I have eight minutes to set up my stage, 12 minutes to put on the greatest show on Earth, and I have seven minutes to take it down. So, that football field is clean for the second half of the game", she said. "How do you do that? This is a Midwesterner girls dream to be performing at the Super Bowl half-time show. In over 25 years of performing that I've done, I have never worked so hard or been so scrupulous or detail-orientated or freaked out." The singer's plan to have 100 drummers descend from the stadium ceiling was canceled, since the structure could not support the weight.

=== Fashion ===
Madonna had promised that there would be no wardrobe malfunction during the show, alluding to controversy surrounding Janet Jackson's performance in the Super Bowl XXXVIII halftime show. Madonna's show's fashion theme was the Roman Empire, with gladiator influences combined with modern Roman elements. Costume designer B. Akerlund created the dresses. Akerlund called on other designers to contribute to the costumes, which included Givenchy haute couture, boots by Miu Miu and earrings by Bvlgari. She worked closely with Madonna, who was involved with details including costuming the show's gladiators. According to Akerlund:

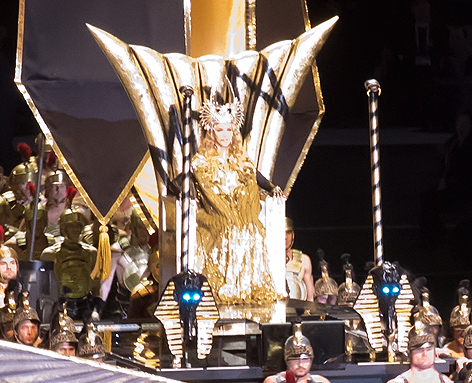
Madonna on a throne during the entrance, wearing a pleated overskirt designed by Riccardo Tisci for Givenchy

This was by far the biggest challenge I have ever taken on in my career, and I could not be more honored to be a part of such an amazing and historical event. Nothing could ever come close to working with Madonna on this Super Bowl performance, her attention to detail and commitment to all of her projects is truly inspiring and life changing.

Madonna's first dress was black, with a gold-colored, pleated overskirt designed by Riccardo Tisci for Givenchy. The singer wore heavy jewelry, her blonde hair long and tightly waved, with diamond earrings by Bvlgari. Her first costume also had a gold-sequined cape with a leopard-print chiffon lining and Philip Treacy headgear. For "Give Me All Your Luvin'", Madonna, Minaj and M.I.A. wore red-and-black cheerleader outfits and carried gold-colored pom-poms. The singer wore a long-sleeved black gown over the short black dress for her last performance. Riccardo Tisci said that he had made all of Madonna's clothes, gloves, belts, hats and underwear. He had 28 choices for the singer, who decided on the gold cape. Although Tisci and his team had designed a shorter version of the cape, they had to re-do it for the singer. The performance featured 100 drumline performers, 150 gladiators (who wore black Calvin Klein underwear) and 200 choir singers.

=== Stage setup ===
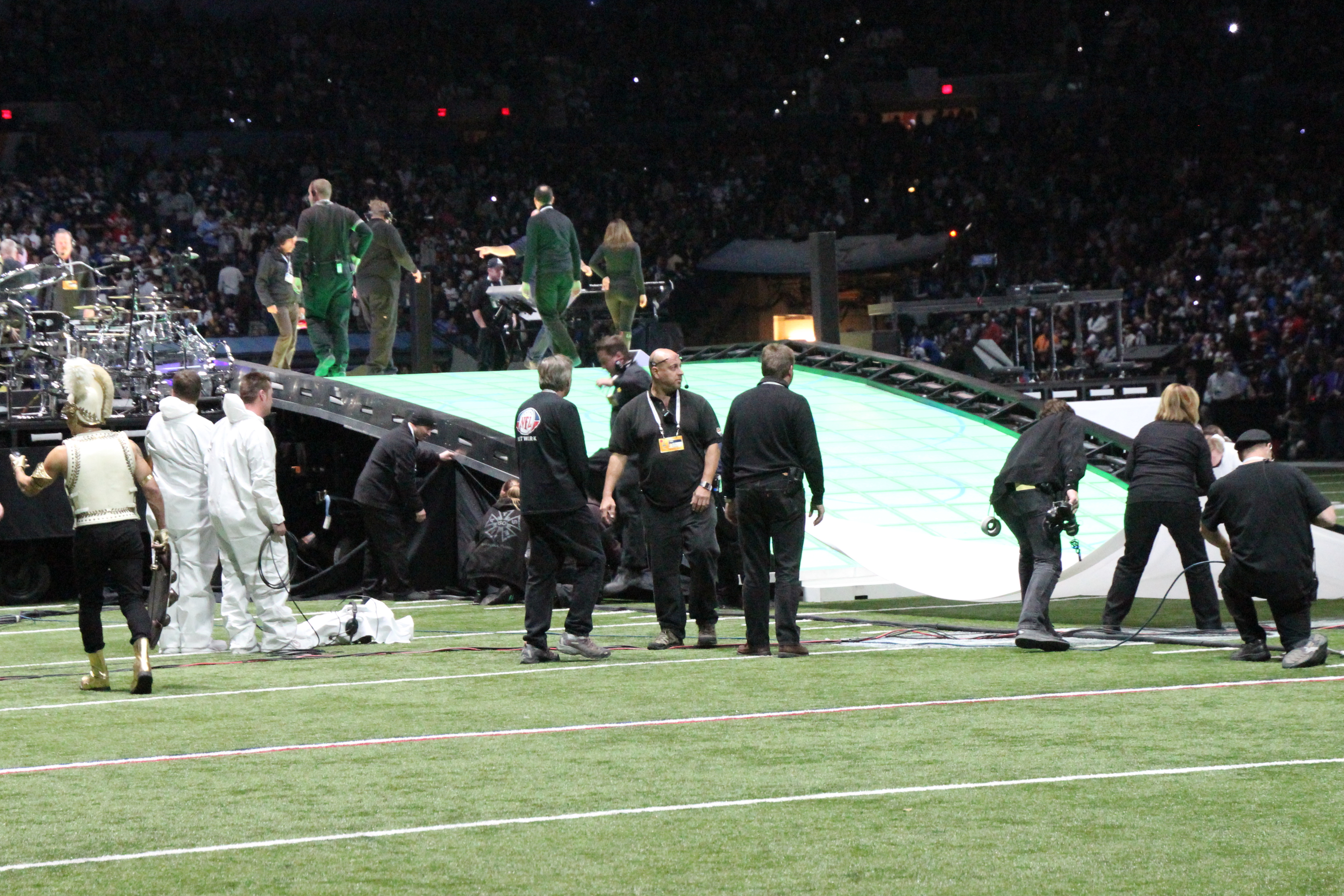
The stage being set up for the halftime show and...

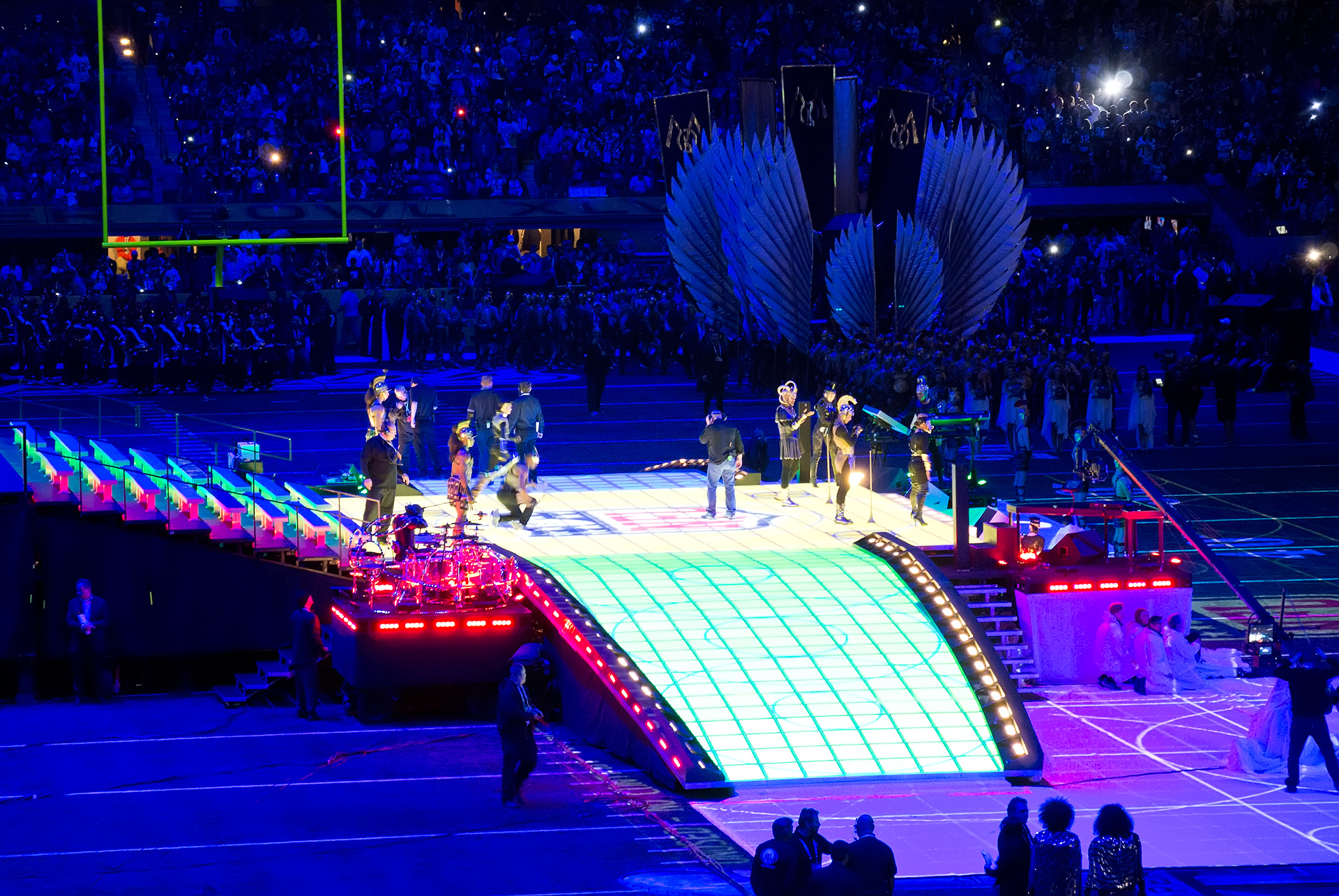
... the final stage after completion

The 1,500 crew members were allotted seven minutes to set up the stage, with the California-based Torrence All Access Staging and Productions handling the required equipment. Erik Eastland of the company, who oversaw the setup, had been associated with the Grammy Awards and the Daytime Emmy Awards. About 70 percent of the workers were volunteers who underwent six months of screening, and the remainder were stage-vendor employees. The main stage was 120 feet (36.6 m) long and modular, assembled in segments from six large trucks. The crew also set up the lighting, video, special effects and audio equipment.

The challenge may come from working outside in the elements. It could be 50 degrees when we rehearse and 50 below on game day, we're working under the pretext that we can be doing this in snow or rain ... In a normal indoor environment we have seven minutes to install the stage and get it camera ready. That can be stretched to nine minutes. It's the same time frame for this.

According to setup coordinator Douglas Cook, the rehearsals enabled them to reduce the setup time to under five minutes. Cook, who had worked on previous halftime shows, understood the details and guided the team. Drawings of the performances depicted what was expected for each setup, with the volunteers assembling the stage in segments and moving them to the field with carts. Madonna's entrance had to be rehearsed several times for coordination. Although Cook learned during the game that the New England Patriots were scheduled to exit on the route used by volunteers carrying the stage equipment, he resolved the issue by talking with the team.

Set designer Bruce Rodgers, who had worked with Madonna on the Drowned World Tour in 2001, was familiar with the singer's work ethic. Rodgers, director Hamish Hamilton and executive producer Ricky Kirshner met several times with Madonna's team, represented by choreographer Jamie King (who presented the show's initial concept). Rodgers developed a large, cross-shaped stage with a central platform accessible by five hidden lifts, bleachers with an escape system at the rear, four positions for the band to play, an area for slacklining at one edge and ramps at the two ends of the cross. At the front of the stage was a 149 ft × 90 ft (45 m × 27 m) white fabric, the main screen for the Moment Factory projections. Props included a Jimmie Martin-designed gold-leaf throne on a barge carried by 150 gladiators. Rodgers' greatest challenges were getting the barge onstage and rehearsing the procession.

=== Multimedia and video ===
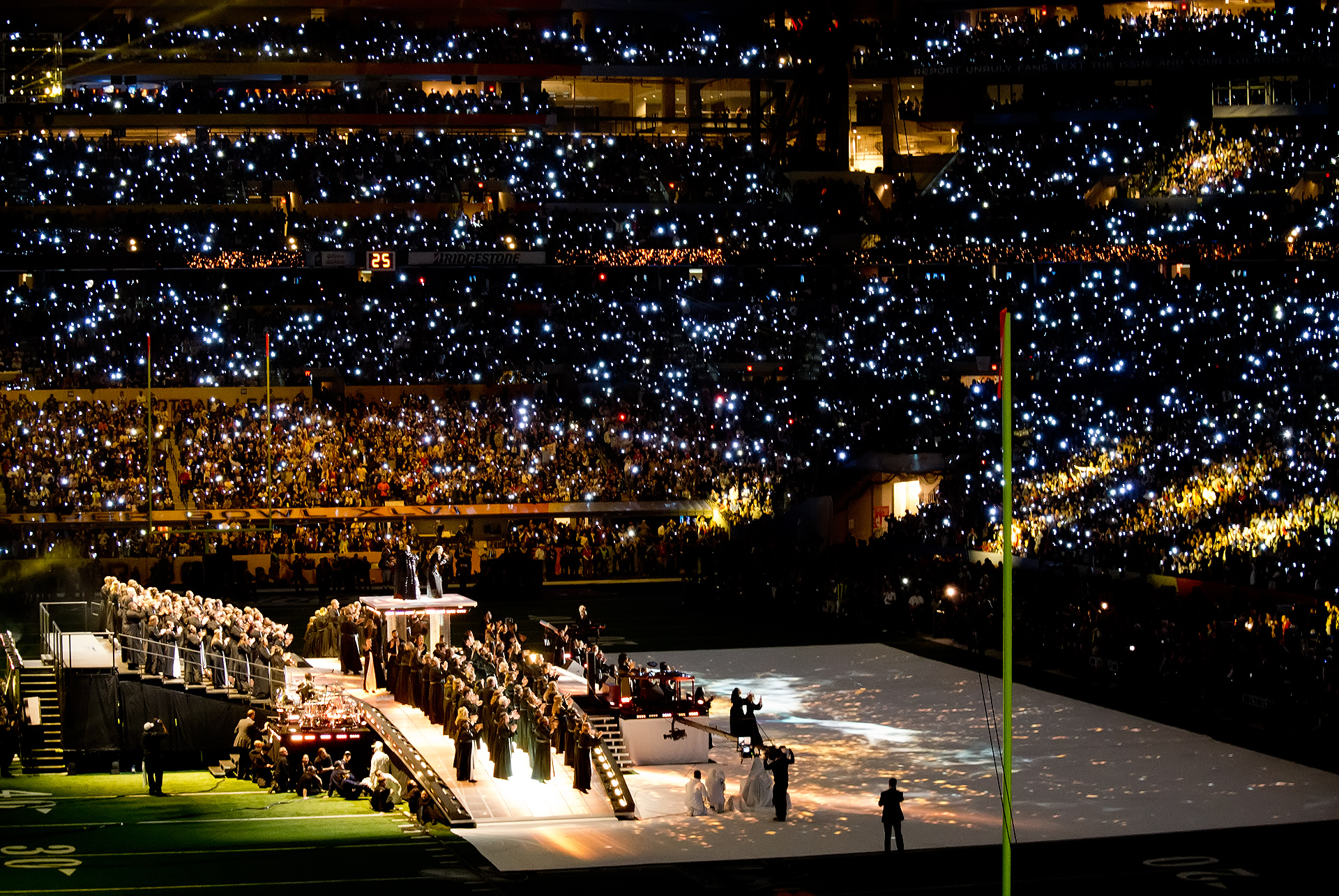
During "Like a Prayer", projection mapping was used to achieve an effect which made the stage seem "to suck up the grass and chalk from the football field".

The stage used multimedia projection and technology conceived by Moment Factory and Cirque du Soleil. After Madonna's entrance, the ground and stage floor revealed animated Vogue magazine covers featuring the singer. The effect was achieved by projection mapping, which turns an object (often irregularly-shaped) into a surface for video projection. Although projection mapping had been used to introduce the Nokia Lumia and project images of NBA players on the Hudson River in 2011, it had never been used on such a large scale. Moment Factory partner and executive producer Eric Fournier said that since the studio had been associated with technology-dependent shows, preparing for and accommodating the requirements of the Super Bowl were easy. When Moment Factory began the halftime-show preparations, Madonna's team had already selected the songs, and the studio developed visual effects complementing the songs' choreography. According to Moment Factory creative director Sakchin Bessette, using video projections was the most efficient method for the visual effects, as this required moving less equipment to the field than other methods. Fournier said, "It all came from the decision at the beginning to make a show out of it, not just a performance. Madonna's a perfectionist, and she wanted to do something extraordinary, so that was the objective of everybody."

The show's major concepts included the shifting magazine covers, the Egyptian-inspired procession, "intergalactic" boomboxes during "Music" and an effect which made the "stage appear to suck up the grass and chalk from the football field". Some visuals were synchronized with the dancers and Madonna's movements. When the visuals were decided, the Moment Factory and Cirque du Soleil staff watched the performances closely to adapt the backdrops to the choreography. Fournier relied on a "disciplined" team enlisted by the NFL and experienced with the video setup, which totaled 32 HD Barco projectors. The projectors were attached to eight pods of four projectors each to cover the entire stadium. Barco's Projector Toolset was used to operate the screens and display the show's videos. According to Fournier, "On TV there were a lot of closeups of Madonna and the dancers, but from the audience in the stadium, the show covered 50 yards. That was the idea: that the show, in essence, must eclipse the size of the stadium." A consistent 10 to 12 people worked on the project to create, in essence, two shows: one for those at the stadium and one for the TV audience. Moment Factory coordinated with the show's producers so it would be projected properly on television. Bessette said that the video resolution of the videos was very high (almost 18 times that of normal high definition) and moving the video files to proper locations was a problem: "We had to find a solution that would be spectacular and that would fit within those parameters".

Rodgers used LMG, Inc for video, light and audio equipment. LMG, in turn, collaborated with the live-event production company DWP Live on the show's projection. According to DWP founder Danny Whetstone, using Barco helped with seamless projection and brightness adjustment: "It was essential that we hang the projectors straight down, 151 feet in the air, lens to field, in order to fill the enormous visual area with the converged image". Barco's HD20 has a 20,000-lumen lighting capacity, rendering clear, bright images with high contrast.

=== Lighting and sound ===
Madonna had a definite and very strong idea of what she wanted, and the design was driven very largely by that. We ended with an amalgamation of our original concepts to deliver her vision, and I knew I would do something different, depending on which songs were sung, and that was decided rather late in the scheme of things.

— Lighting designer Al Gurdon, on the show's conceptualization

Lucas Oil Stadium was equipped with Sharpys lighting arrangements from Clay Paky for the halftime show. Lighting designer Al Gurdon of Incandescent Designs enlisted console group PRG to help him install 204 Sharpys across the main stage. According to Gurdon, Madonna conceived the main idea; the choreography-driven show, centered on the main stage, was less logistically challenging than those in previous years. However, Gurdon had to ensure that the audience could enjoy the show from a distance and that Madonna was highlighted properly for the cameras. He and board operator Mike Owen brainstormed in England and tried a number of schemes for a week with CAST software. A "cleaner" approach was taken to prevent interference between the video projections and lighting. Gurdon placed the Sharpys together in rectangular areas, with 16 to 20 lights in each. This resulted in a strong, compact, moving light which could be split into smaller beams as needed.

Since the arrangement had to be set up in seven minutes, Gurdon developed a rig. He flew equipment to the roof of Lucas Oil, attaching it at a height of 175 feet (53.3 m) so that it would not interfere with camera movement during the game. At halftime, it was lowered to light the stadium. Golden light was used for the opening sequence, followed by black and white strobes for "Vogue". A multicolored palette illuminated "Music", and red predominated during "Give Me All Your Luvin'". "Like a Prayer" had another stream of gold Sharpys, evoking rays of sunlight.

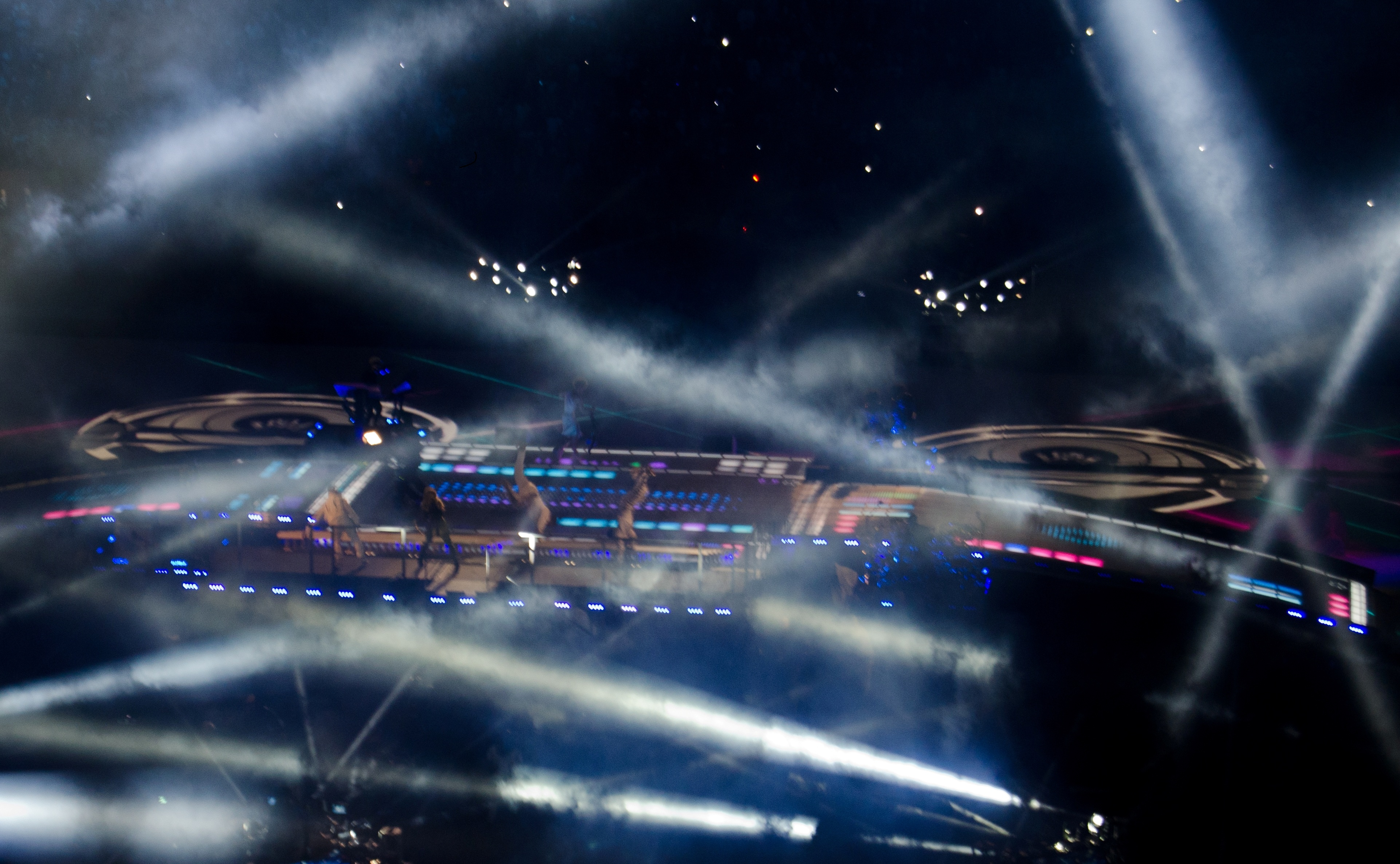
Color scrollers used during "Music"

Sennheiser sound equipment was used for the audio. According to Matt Napier, Madonna's monitor engineer, they used Sennheiser's Wireless Systems Manager software to tweak frequencies. Madonna used an HSP 4 headset at the beginning of the show, later switching to a Sennheiser SKM 5200-II handheld transmitter. Sennheiser transmitters were also used by Minaj, M.I.A. and LMFAO, and Green's microphone used an MD 5235 capsule. Napier said in a Mix article that they needed gold-plated transmitters for Madonna and Green, which were provided by Sennheiser the day of the show. Professional Wireless Systems (PWS), a Masque Sound company, were in charge of wireless sound monitoring; in a series of trial runs, PWS chose a frequency that eliminated interference from other systems.

According to LMG video technologist Ken Gay, lighting, sound and television teams met at the Orange County Convention Center to test the setup. They used simple fabrics on the ground to test the lighting projections for the stage. Sakchin Bessette had samples to be used for projections, which helped LMG in its tests. The team's Mark Sanford monitored the cameras for any reflections from the fabric caused by the projections, calculating their effect during the show and adjusting camera placement accordingly. LMG tested the projection pods used from the ceilings at its Orlando headquarters. The pods were positioned 150 feet (46 m) above the ground, using the fabric from the previous test. Concerned that the stadium grass would affect the projections, the company used Heavy Knit Bright White fabric from All Access.

== Critical response ==
The halftime show was critically acclaimed. Said Marc Schneider of Billboard: "It's Madonna Louise Ciccone's world, we're just living in it". Randall Roberts of the Los Angeles Times wrote that although the choice of Madonna as halftime-show performer was a subject of discussion, the singer was "defiantly unconcerned with the more conservative red state wing of the football fanbase who'd never be caught dead singing along to one of her songs ... and her halftime show was pure spectacle by the Cleopatra of the game ... Madonna is Madonna for a reason. And we saw it firsthand Sunday." Chicago Tribune critic Greg Kot called the show an "S&M party in Ancient Egypt". Along with reminding the audience of her older hits, Madonna had "important career-advancing work to do ... [The singer], after all, never does anything unless she's got something to sell, and with a new studio album due out in March and a tour to follow, she had plenty on her to-do list". Jon Pareles of The New York Times wrote that although the singer was not as "indefatigable" as she had been, she was a "party girl turned regent: a queen on her throne, a homecoming queen strutting in the bleachers, a church singer fronting a choir". Pareles called Madonna "grown-up", and wrote that she put on a show appropriate for the NFL.

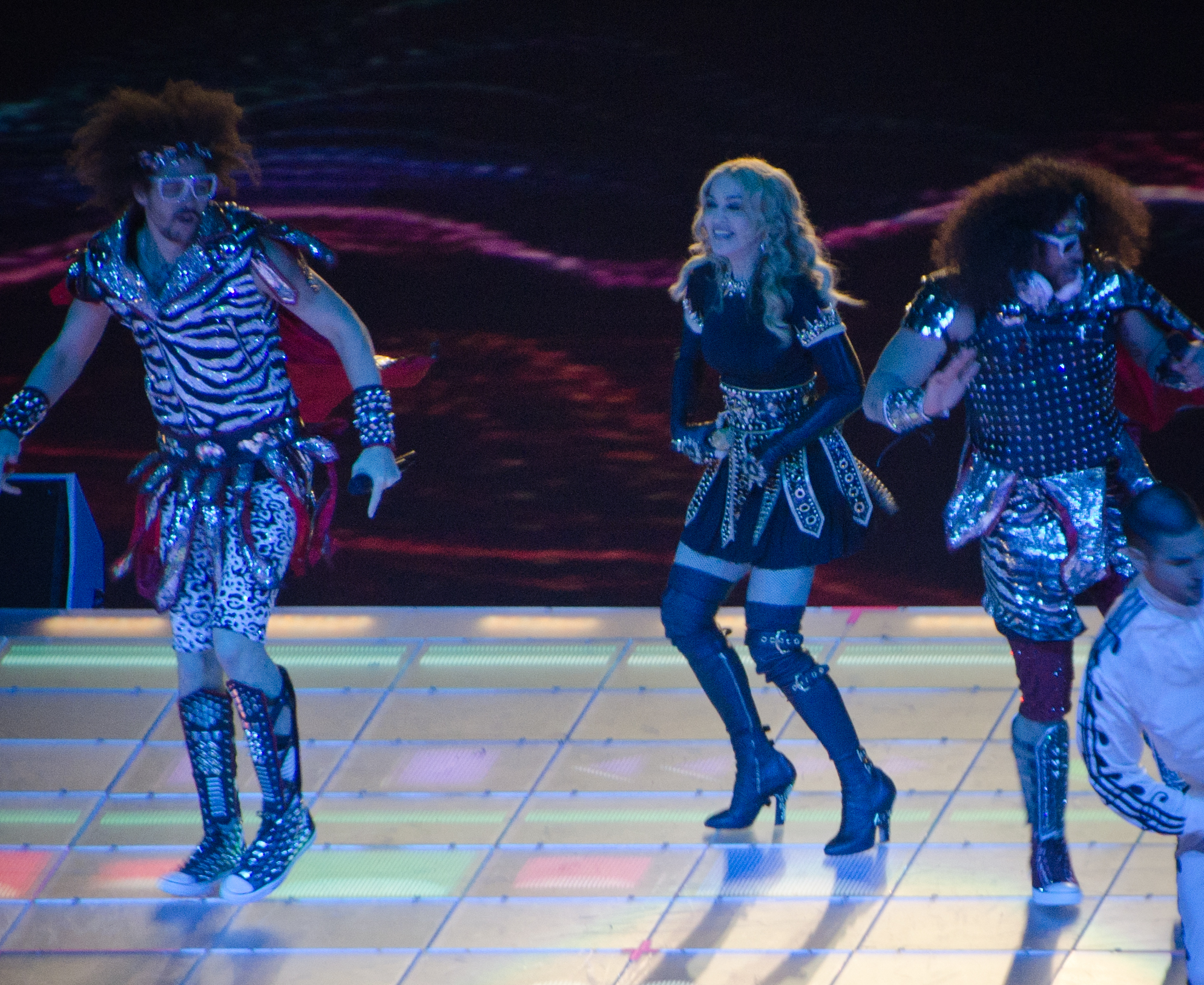
Madonna and LMFAO during the mash-up of "Music" and "Sexy and I Know It"

Ken Tucker of Entertainment Weekly said that Madonna delivered a "joyous, unironic, openhearted" show rather than a cautious performance. According to Tucker, the singer was in "full command"; although the visuals lacked flow, the song transitions meshed "perfectly". Neil McCormick of The Daily Telegraph called the show a "tribute to Madonna" and a "shameless" promotion of the singer's return to the music scene after directing W.E.: "The message [of the show] is that she is back in business. I suspect she'd settle for a global number one over global harmony". Troy Patterson of Slate wrote that Madonna retained her "greatest marketing agent" title with the show and praised its costumes, sets and the singer's repeated self-referencing. Linda Holmes of NPR said, "What's curious, given how much 'ewww, she's too old' stuff went around on Twitter, is that everything she did Sunday night is exactly what it should mean to age gracefully".

Miriam Coleman of Rolling Stone called the show a "serious spectacle", and Mario Tarradell of The Dallas Morning News called it a "high-concept music video": "Madonna brilliantly manipulates the combined impact of visuals and sonics. The 13-minute performance was an eye-popping marvel". A Huffington Post reviewer wrote, "Love her or hate her, there's no doubt that only Madonna can bring a certain level of pop flair to a performance". Spencer Kornhaber of The Atlantic praised the show's choreography and cinematography: "With so, so much to look at, Madonna remained the center of attention. That is, until the end, when white light and smoke engulfed her and she dropped down through the stage, out of sight". According to Joey Guerra of the Houston Chronicle, Madonna controlled her nerves and he liked her selection of songs. Peter Robinson of The Guardian called the performance low-key for the singer, despite the large audience. Robinson wrote that the show's budget would "[make] your average James Cameron effort look like Homes Under the Hammer", and called Madonna's entrance and exit his favorite parts of the show.

Cara Kelly of The Washington Post gave the show a mixed review; although it was "revolutionary" after Janet Jackson's wardrobe malfunction, it was a "pathetic attempt at a comeback". According to Lou Harry of the Indianapolis Business Journal, Madonna lacked focus and energy and the audience response was lukewarm. Harry called the show an "awkward celebration", but praised its overall production. USA Today's Elyssa Gardner wrote, "Madonna herself, stylish but hardly provocative in tailored tops and skirts that showed off her yoga-toned gams, delivered [the songs] and other flourishes with a winking sense of humor". David Zurawik of The Baltimore Sun called the show "Madonna's zombie halftime", criticizing its song choices and overall concept: "[Madonna's] acting as if she's almost singing. I say almost, because there is not a whit of artistic aspiration in the star performer or the production as far I can tell. But hey, that's our sad-sack, super-sized, gross American culture these days, isn't it. And it is perfectly suited for empty Super Bowl half-time spectacle".

== Commercial impact ==
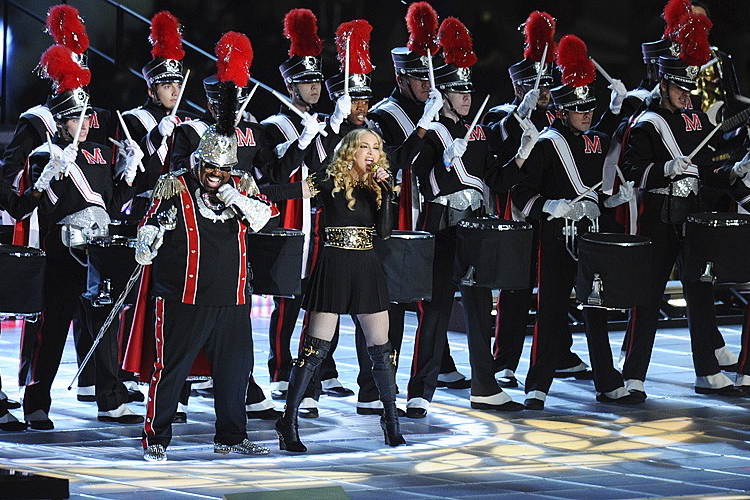
Madonna performs "Open Your Heart" and "Express Yourself" with CeeLo Green and the Center Grove High School drum line

Like previous performers, Madonna was not paid for the show. According to Zack O'Malley Greenburg of Forbes, "Typically, the entertainers for the Super Bowl do not get a cash payment ... This is the kind of exposure that entertainers would give their right arm for; they could do 20 Leno and Letterman appearances and still not reach that [kind of] audience". Greenburg wrote that with 30-second commercial spots commanding over $3 million apiece, the 12 minutes of free television exposure had a total value of $84 million for Madonna's enterprises and the singer did not have to pay for accommodations, travel, backup dancers, stage setup, advertising and publicity: "Given all these benefits, playing the Super Bowl halftime show for free is more than worth the trouble. In fact, it's incredibly lucrative – and such a good deal for artists that some suspect a major change might be on the horizon".

Madonna's performance was the most-watched Super Bowl halftime show in history, with 114 million viewers – more than the game itself, which had 111.3 million viewers. It reached more than 47 million homes. According to the Nielsen ratings, the show had a 47.4 household rating; among adults 18–49 it had a 41.5 rating, compared with the game average of 40.5. Tim Kenneally from Reuters noted that the half-hour from 9:30 to 9:58 ET peaked at a 50.7 household rating and a 72 share, with 117.7 million viewers. The record was later broken by Bruno Mars in 2014 (115 million) and Katy Perry in 2015 (118 million). Madonna set a record as the most-tweeted subject on Twitter (10,245 posts in one second, with an average of 8,000 tweets per second for five minutes) and was the most-searched term on Google during the show. Wired CEO Mark Ghuneim tweeted that less than one-third of the tweets were negative, 59 percent were positive and 11 percent were neutral. According to Billboard, the day after the show its ratings and economic impact were discussed.

The show's chief impact was on Madonna's music. Keith Caulfield of Billboard wrote that about 50,000 pre-orders for Madonna's 12th studio album, MDNA, were placed within three days of its availability on the iTunes Store. That week, according to Nielsen SoundScan, "Give Me All Your Luvin'" had 115,000 digital downloads and the singer's catalog of older albums had a 410 percent increase in sales (from 5,000 to 26,000 copies). A week after the Super Bowl, "Give Me All Your Luvin'" had an additional 165,000 digital downloads (a 44-percent increase) and her other songs sold a combined 166,000 copies (up from 94,000 the previous week). "Give Me All Your Luvin'" reached number ten on the Billboard Hot 100 singles chart; the singer's 38th top-ten hit, it increased her record as the artist with the most top-ten singles on the chart. Madonna's back catalog of albums also had increased sales due to discounting and publicity generated by the single and her performance. Billboard estimated that her top-10 digital sales collectively increased over 1,700 percent. Madonna's bestselling album was the 2009 greatest-hits collection, Celebration, which sold 16,000 copies (up 1,341 percent) and reentered the Billboard 200 album chart. The following week Celebration fell 105 spots on the chart to number 157, with sales falling to 4,000 copies. "Give Me All Your Luvin'" fell to number 39 on the Hot 100, with sales falling by 58 percent to 69,000 copies. The show affected slacklining; The New York Times reported, "[Andy Lewis] and his sport had never appeared before an audience like the one commanded by Madonna at halftime of the Super Bowl". According to professional slackliner Frankie Najera, "That was by far the biggest thing that has happened for the sport".

== M.I.A. controversy ==
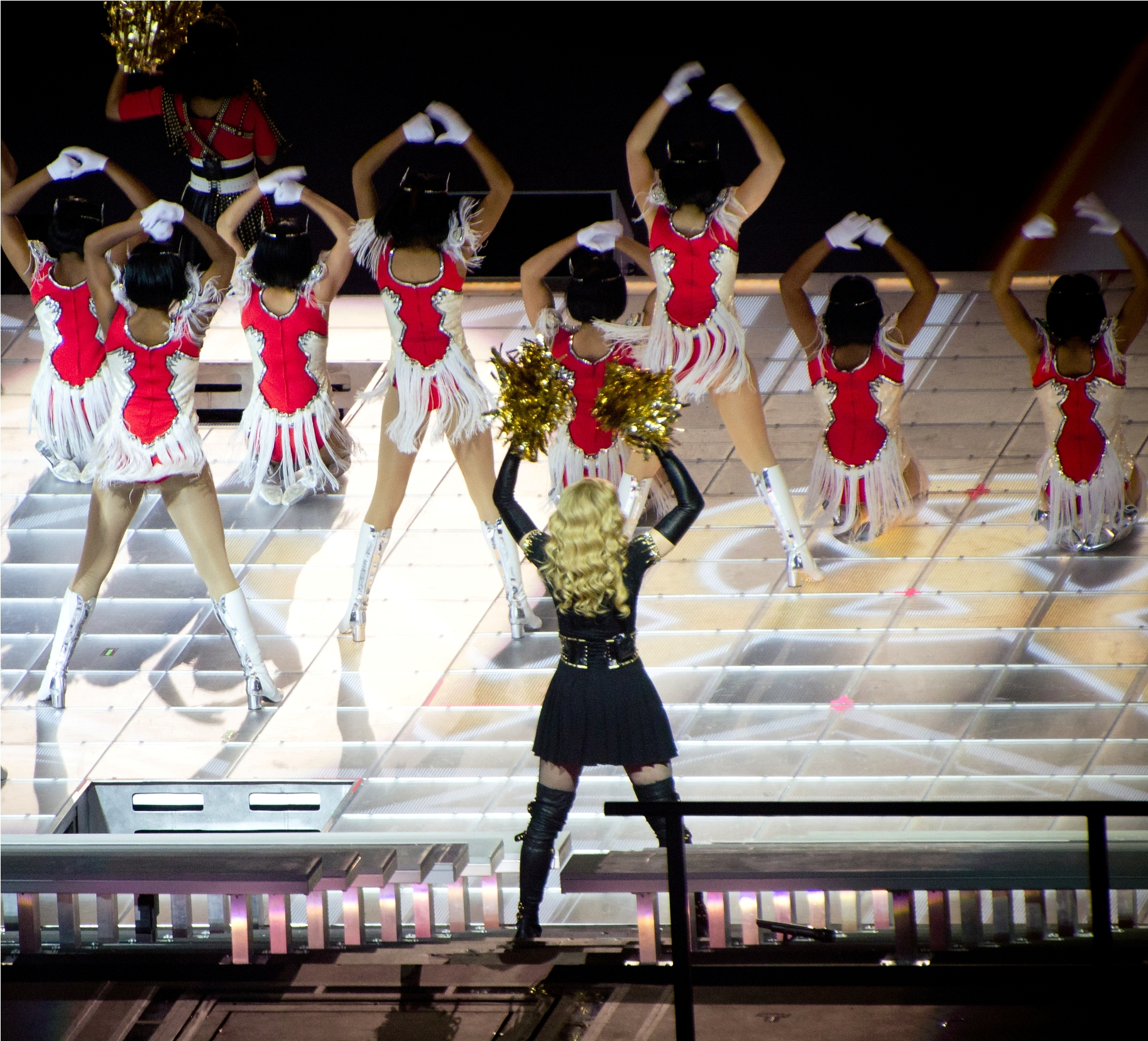
Madonna dancing with pom-poms during "Give Me All Your Luvin'". M.I.A. (front) showed her middle finger to the camera near the end of her verse.

M.I.A. extended her middle finger to the camera near the end of her verse in "Give Me All Your Luvin'" instead of singing the word "shit", and the media compared the incident to Janet Jackson's 2004 wardrobe malfunction. According to People, "Call it a finger malfunction? Madonna was supposed to be the center of attention during the Super Bowl halftime show Sunday, but the Queen of Pop was upstaged by her collaborator M.I.A., who flipped off the camera at one point during the performance, prompting swift apologies from the NFL and NBC." Madonna expressed her disappointment in an interview with host Ryan Seacrest on his talk show, On Air with Ryan Seacrest. She said that it was a "teenager ... irrelevant thing" for M.I.A. to do, and was "out of place" in the show: "I was really surprised. I didn't know anything about it. I wasn't happy about it. I understand it's punk rock and everything, but to me there was such a feeling of love and good energy and positivity; it seemed negative."

According to NFL spokesman Brian McCarthy, “There was a failure in NBC's delay system. The obscene gesture in the performance was completely inappropriate, very disappointing, and we apologize to our fans.” McCarthy said that the gesture was not made during rehearsals, and M.I.A. improvised it on stage. NBC responded with, "The NFL hired the talent and produced the halftime show. Our system was late to obscure the inappropriate gesture and we apologize to our viewers.” The Federal Communications Commission received 222 complaints about the rapper's gesture, and Rolling Stone reported that the commission might "punish" the NFL and NBC despite their apologies. Any fine imposed on the NFL would be charged to M.I.A., since the rapper had signed a contract indemnifying the league against FCC fines. A year later, it was reported that the NFL had filed a $1.5 million arbitration claim against M.I.A. for "breach of her contract and flagrant disregard for the values that form the cornerstone of the NFL brand and the Super Bowl". Her lawyer, Howard King, filed a counterclaim calling the NFL's action "hilarious in light of the weekly felonies committed by its stars". M.I.A. enlisted the help of fans in documenting objectionable actions by the NFL to refute the league's claim of damage to its reputation.

In September 2013, M.I.A. released a video statement about the lawsuit. The rapper said, "They're basically [saying] it's OK for me to promote being sexually exploited as a female, than to display empowerment, female empowerment, through being punk rock. That's what it boils down to, and I'm being sued for it". In March 2014, Rolling Stone reported that the NFL had added $15 million to its arbitration claim for a total of $16.6 million. M.I.A. said on Twitter that the NFL wanted a portion of her income, which lacked "any basis in law, fact, or logic", and blamed NBC for its "dereliction" in not blurring out the gesture during the live telecast. M.I.A. tweeted Madonna with a request to borrow $16 million, later deleting the tweet. In August 2014, ESPN reported that the NFL had reached a confidential agreement with M.I.A. Neither attorney Howard King nor the NFL provided any further details.

== Set list ==
1. "Vogue"
2. "Music" / "Party Rock Anthem" (featuring LMFAO, contains elements of "Sexy and I Know It")
3. "Give Me All Your Luvin'" (featuring Nicki Minaj and M.I.A.)
4. "Open Your Heart" / "Express Yourself" (featuring CeeLo Green, the Avon High School Drumline, the Center Grove High School Drumline, the Fishers High School Drumline and the Franklin Central High School Drumline)
5. "Like a Prayer" (featuring CeeLo Green and a choir of 200 local Indianapolis singers)

Source for the set list performed at the show.

== Personnel ==
- Hamish Hamilton – director
- Madonna – performer
- Maya Arulpragasam – performer (as M.I.A.)
- Sofia Boutella – dancer
- Darren Lee Cupp – gladiator
- CeeLo Green – performer
- Andy Lewis – slackliner
- LMFAO – performers
- Nicki Minaj – performer
- Brahim Zaibat – dancer
- Ricky Kirshner – executive producer
- Bruce Rodgers – production
- Anthony Bishop – art direction
- Douglas Cook – art direction
- Shelley Rodgers – art direction
- Bea Akerlund – costumes
- Rob Paine – executive in charge of production
- Lindsey Breslauer – assistant art director
- Robert T. Barnhart – lighting director
- Kevin French – Jib camera operator
- David Grill – lighting director
- Alex Gurdon – lighting designer
- Jay Kulick – camera operator
- Michael Owen – lighting director
- Matt Beckner – talent manager
- Julia Blanford – production assistant
- Rob Crawford – audience producer
- Josh Hughes – production assistant
- Jamie King – creative director / show director
- Eric Mentis – production assistant
- Troy Mosley – field choreographer
- Angelo Ruzzo – production coordinator
- Rod Wardell – technical director

Credits and personnel adapted from the halftime show's name reel.
