= LMG =

LMG or lmg may refer to:

== Organizations ==
- League of the Militant Godless
- The Leon M. Goldstein High School for the Sciences in Brooklyn, NY, US
- Linus Media Group, a Canadian entertainment company known for the Linus Tech Tips YouTube channel
- LMG, LLC, an American company
- BCCM/LMG, a bacterial collection in the Belgian Co-ordinated Collections of Micro-organisms

== Other uses ==
- Light machine gun
