= Most SNP =

Bridge in Bratislava, Slovakia

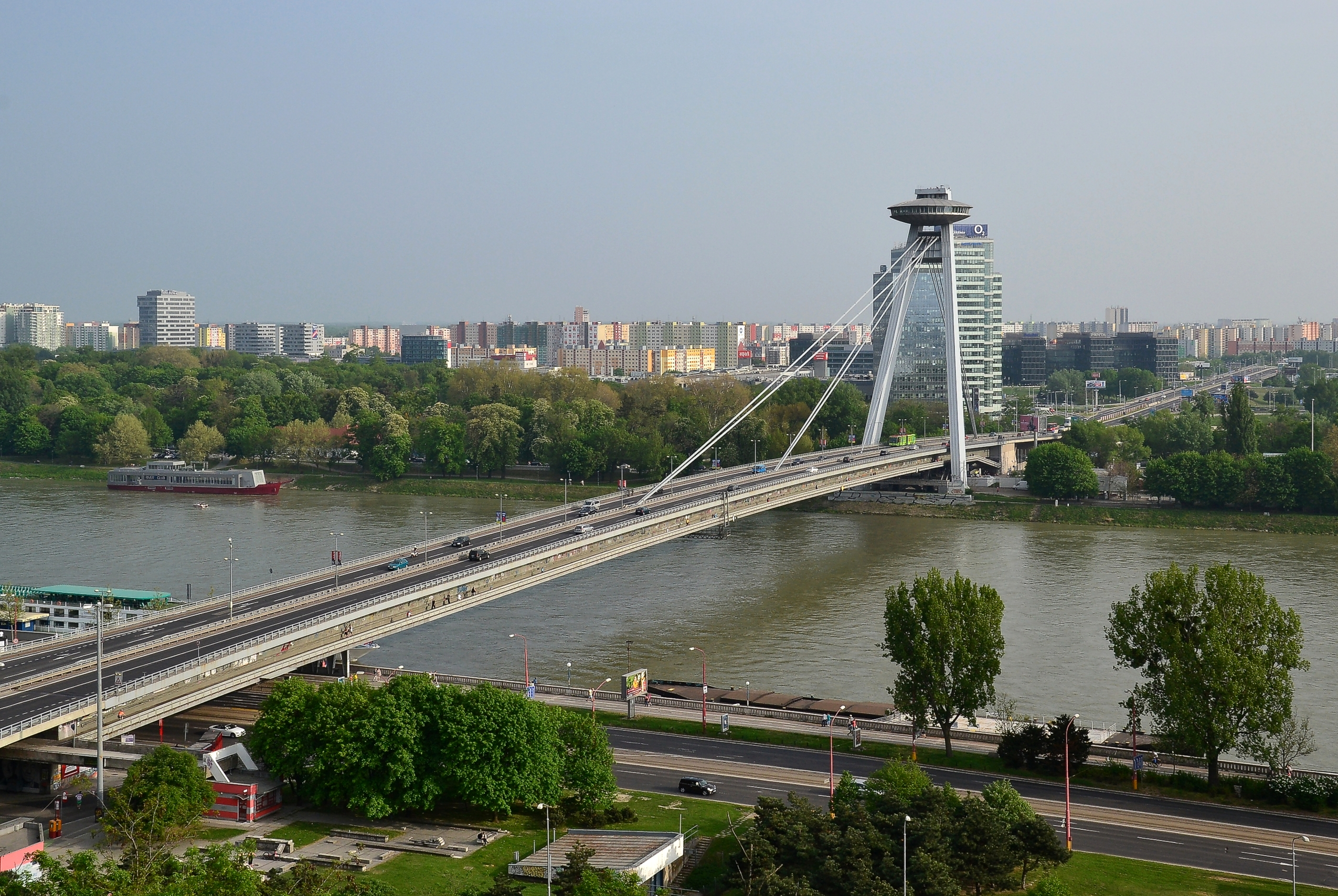
- Most SNP as seen from Bratislava Castle
- Coordinates: 48.1384°N 17.104581°E
- Crosses: Danube
- Locale: Bratislava
- Official name: Most Slovenského národného povstania

Characteristics
- Design: asymmetric, double-decked cable stayed bridge
- Total length: 430.8 metres (1,413 ft)
- Width: 21.0 metres (68.9 ft)
- Height: 84.60 metres (277.6 ft) (height of pylon above ground without appurtenances); 87.2 metres (286 ft) (total height of pylon above ground); 95 metres (312 ft) (total height of pylon above mean level of Danube river)
- Longest span: 303 metres (994 ft)

History
- Construction start: 1967
- Construction end: 1972
- Opened: August 26, 1972

Location
- Interactive map of Most SNP

Most SNP ("Bridge of the Slovak National Uprising"), commonly referred to as Most Slovenského národného povstania or the UFO Bridge, and named Nový most ("New Bridge") from 1993 to 2012, is a road bridge over the Danube in Bratislava, the capital of Slovakia. It is the world's longest bridge to have one pylon and one cable-stayed plane.

Most SNP is an asymmetrical cable-stayed bridge with a main span length of 303 m (994 ft), a total length of 430.8 m (1,413 ft), a width of 21 m (69 ft), and a weight of 537 t (592 short tons). Its steel construction is suspended from steel cables, connected on the Petržalka side to two pillars. There are four lanes for motor traffic on the upper level and lanes for bicycles and pedestrians on the lower level. It is a member of The World Federation of Great Towers.

== History ==
Since its construction in 1972 the bridge was called Most SNP ("Bridge of the Slovak National Uprising"), although locally it was simply called the New Bridge, being the second bridge to be built in the city over the river Danube. In 1993, its name was officially changed by Bratislava City Council to Nový Most ("New Bridge") to reflect general usage. However, another three bridges have been constructed since its opening, and so in 2012 the City Council voted to change the bridge's name back to Most SNP. The change took effect on 29 August 2012, the 68th anniversary of the Slovak National Uprising.

The bridge was built between 1967 and 1972 under a project managed by A. Tesár, J. Lacko and I. Slameň. It officially opened on August 26, 1972. A significant section of the Old Town below which included nearly all of the Jewish quarter, was demolished to create the roadway that led to it. On the other hand, the bridge improved access between Petržalka and the rest of the city. Parts of the historic city walls were unearthed during construction.

The SNP bridge was the central motif of Jean Michel Jarre's "Bridge from the Future" concert, which he performed on May 12, 2024.

On September 18, 2026 Estonian slackliner Jaan Roose set a world record in Bratislava by covering 14,7 km in 12 hours on a 666-metre-long slackline stratched between the UFO observation tower on the SNP Bridge and Bratislava castle.

== Restaurant and observation deck ==
A special attraction is the flying saucer-shaped structure atop the bridge's 84.6 m (278 ft) pylon, housing an observation deck and a restaurant, which since 2005 has been called UFO (previously, Bystrica). The restaurant serves both traditional Slovak and international cuisine, describing its cuisine as "Mediterasian". It received the Restaurant of the Year award in 2011.

Both the restaurant and the observation deck offer panoramic views of Bratislava. They are reached using lifts located in the east pillar, accessed from the walking and cycling paths on either side of the bridge. Access to the lifts normally costs €11.90 as of January 2024, but this fee is deducted from the bill for restaurant guests.

The west pillar of the bridge tower houses an emergency staircase with 430 steps.

== Gallery ==
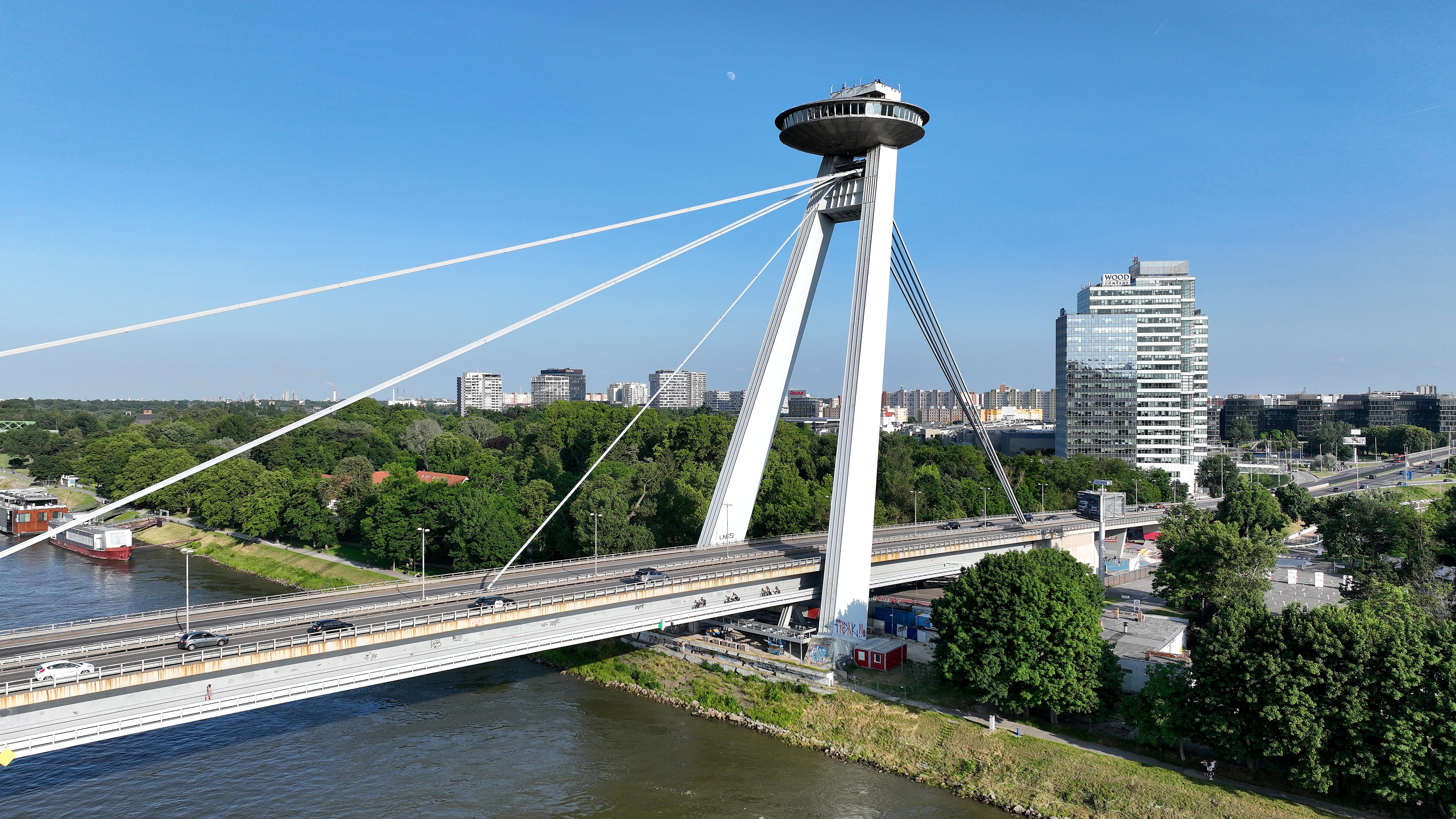
Pylon of the Bridge

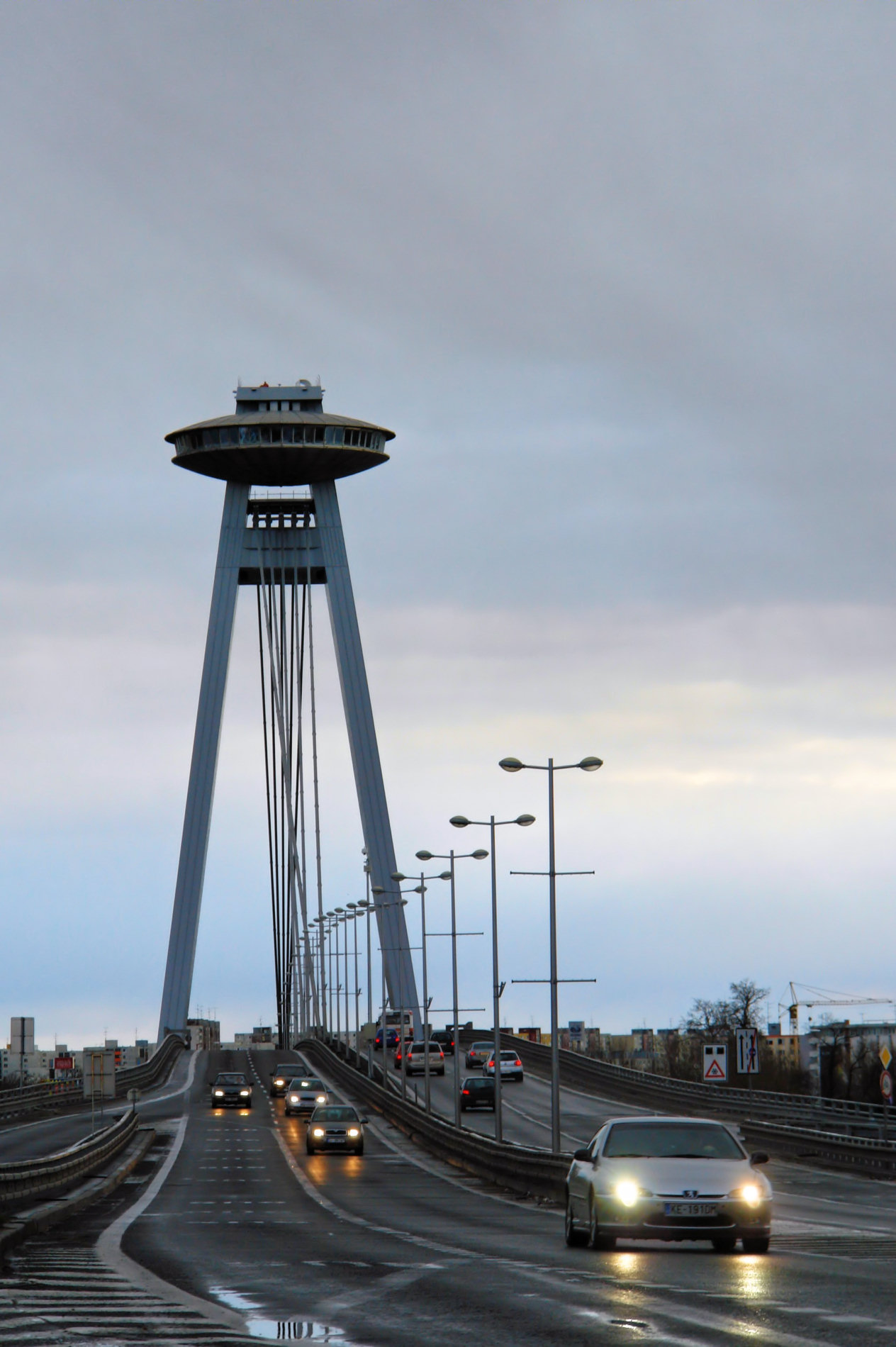
View of the pylon and "UFO"

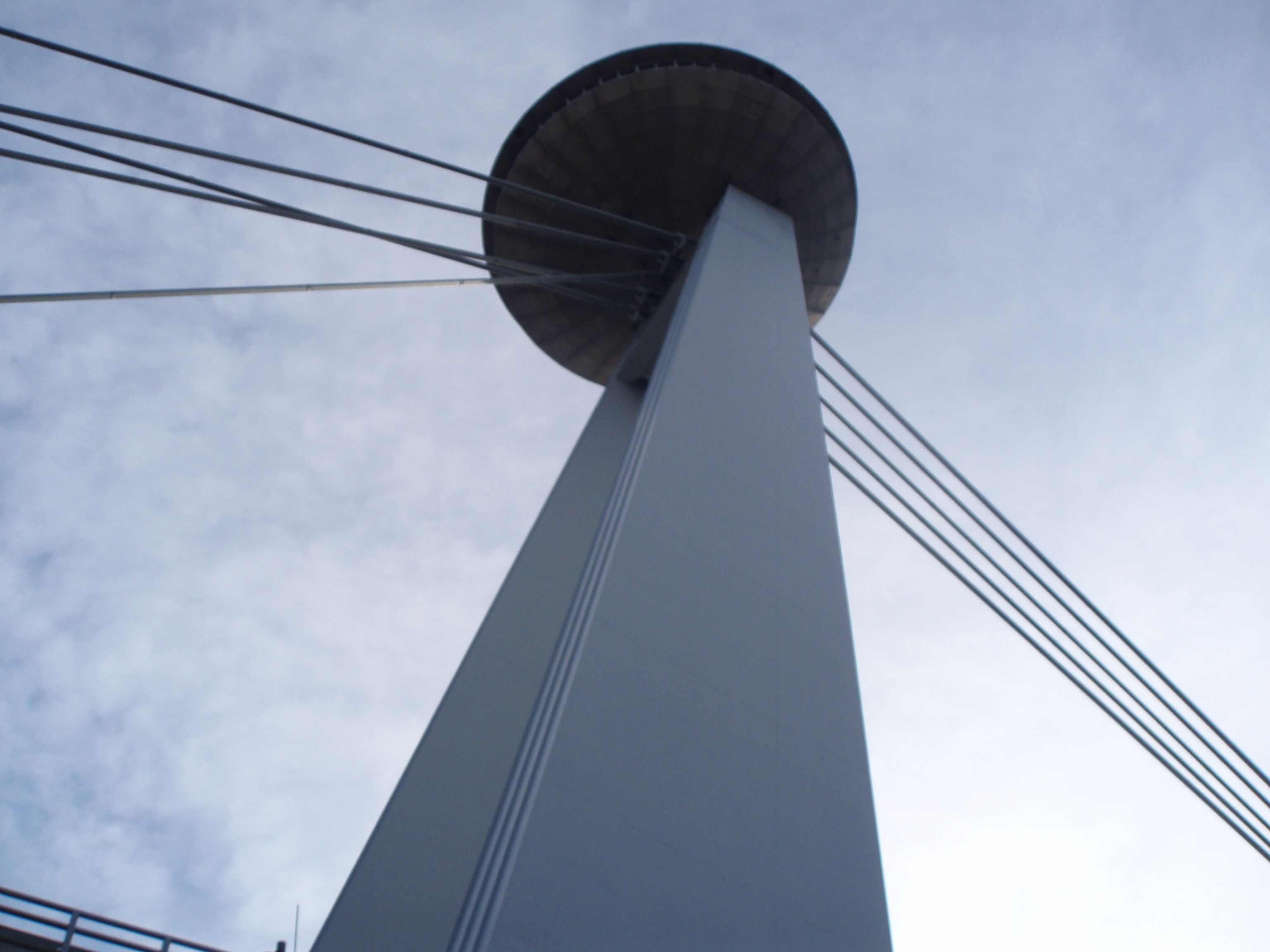
Close-up of the bridge's pylon and the "flying saucer" from below

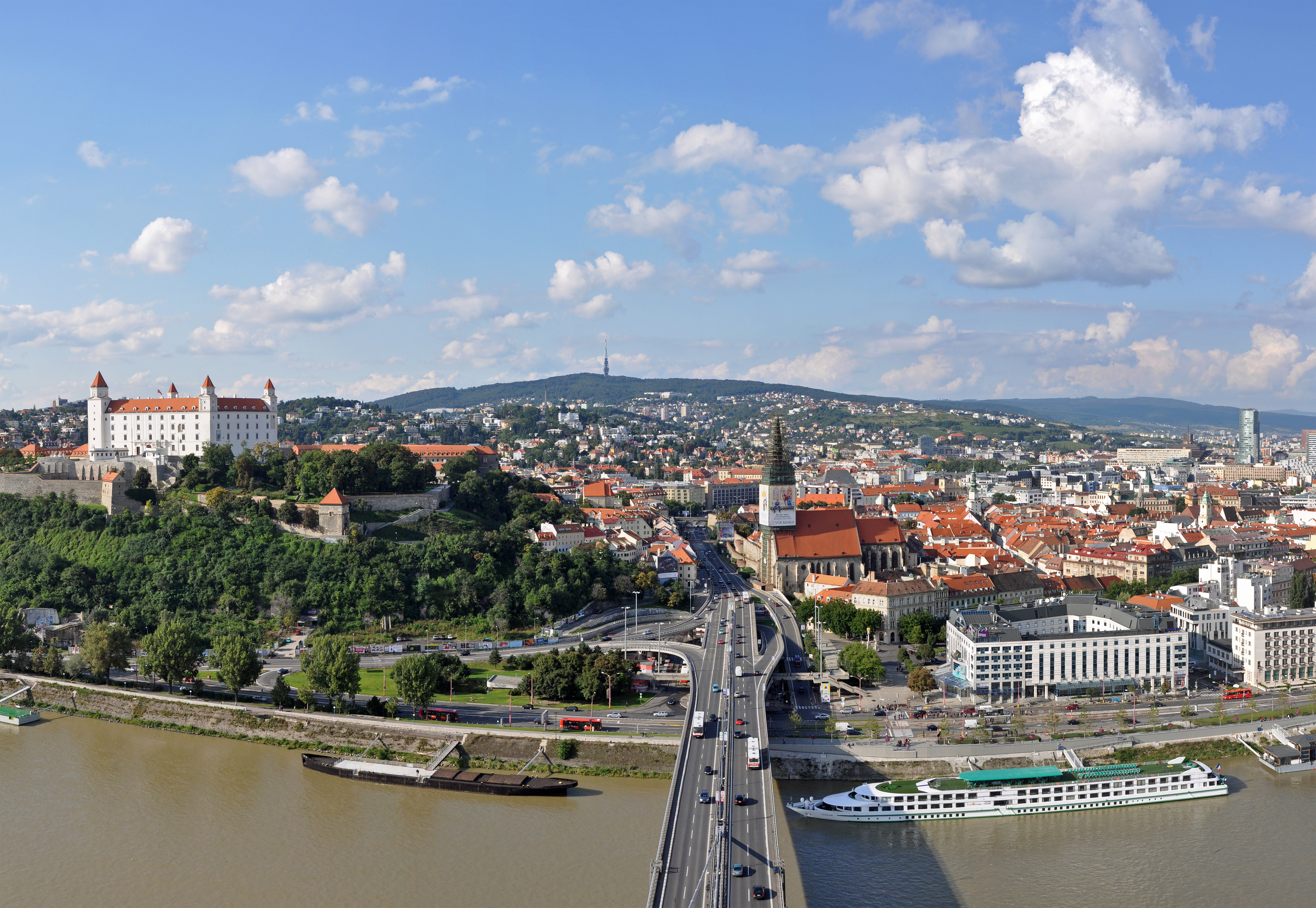
Bratislava Castle and St. Martin's Cathedral, as seen from Most SNP

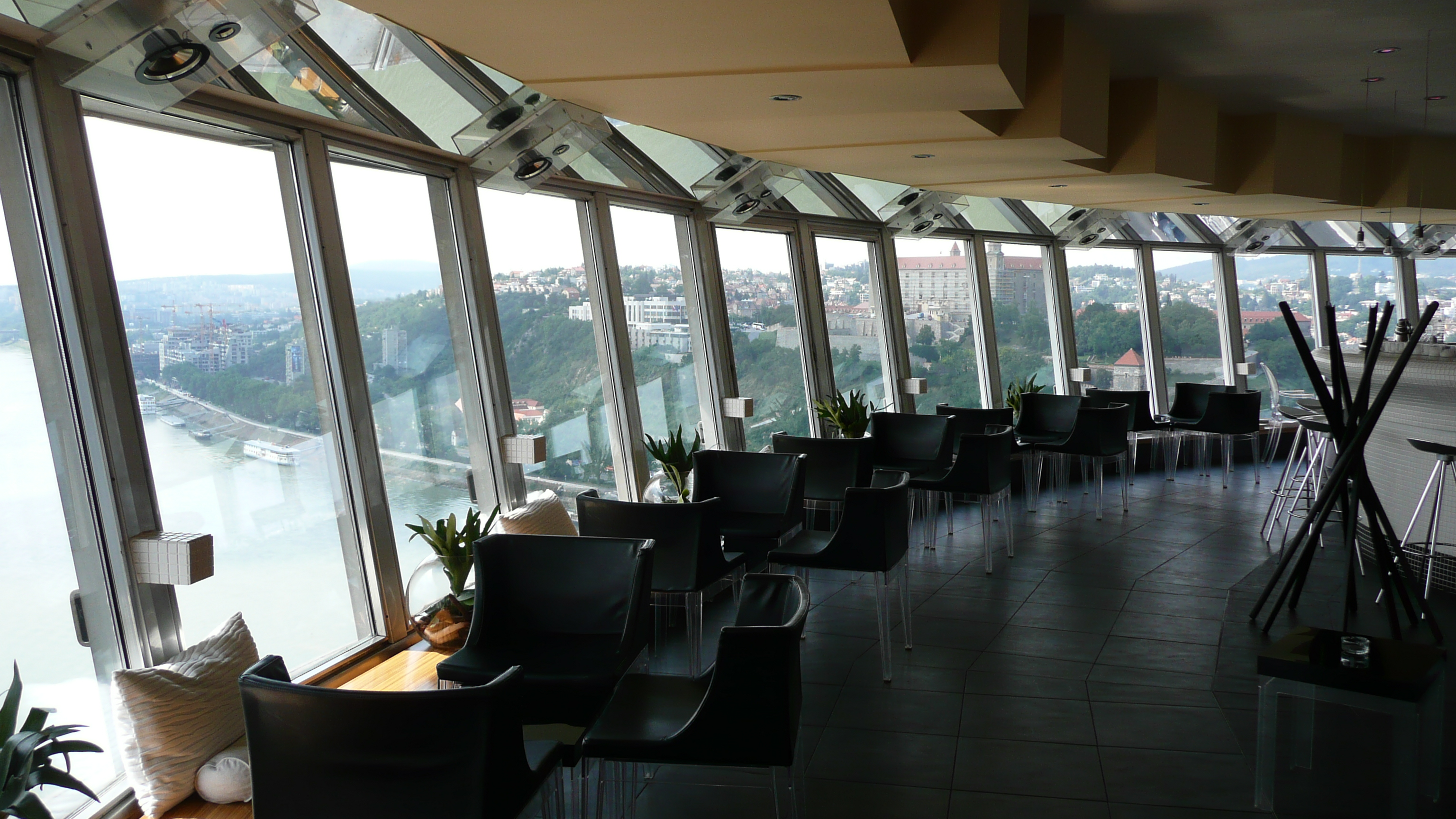
A daytime view of the restaurant's interior

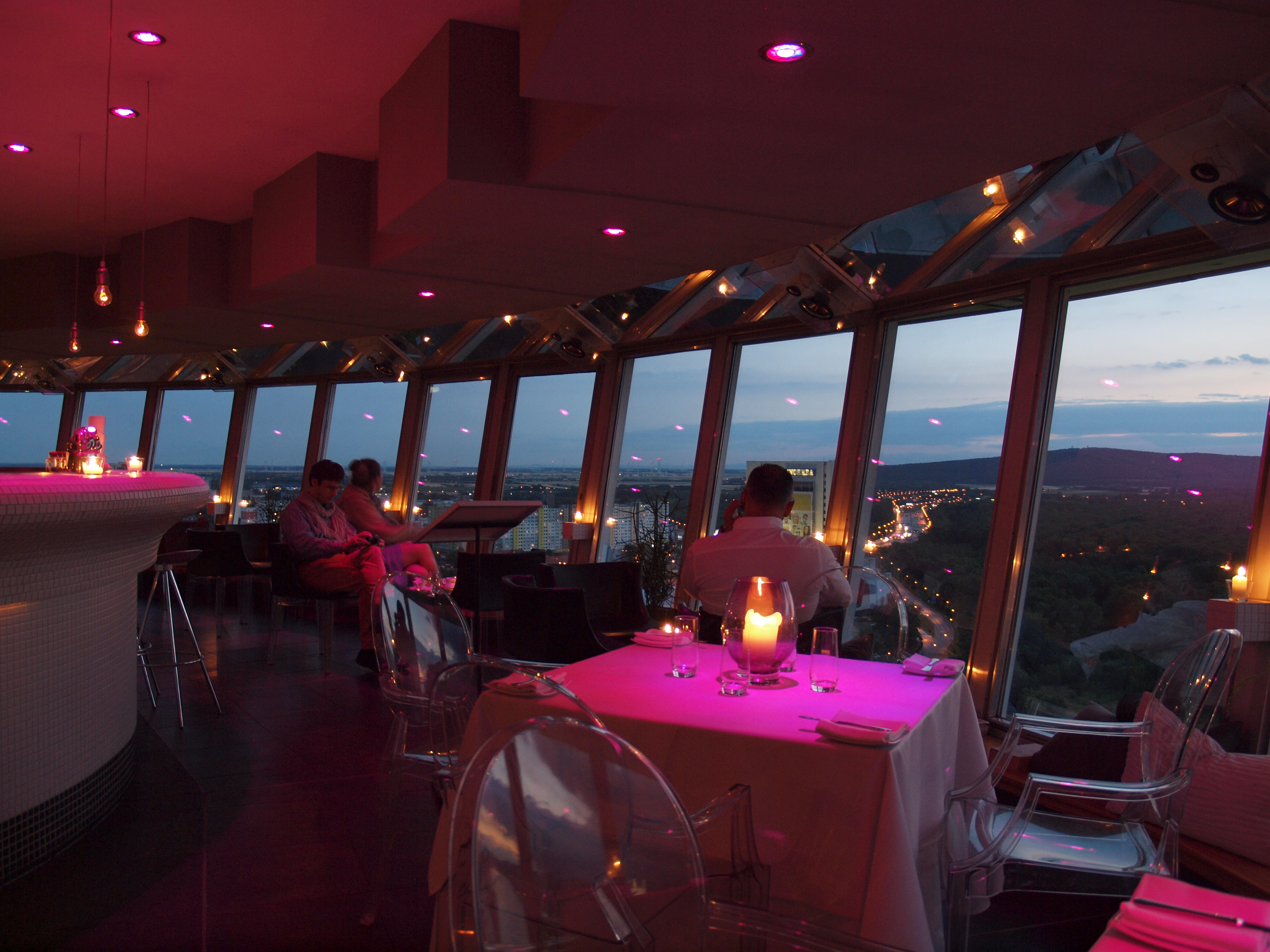
The interior of the restaurant at night

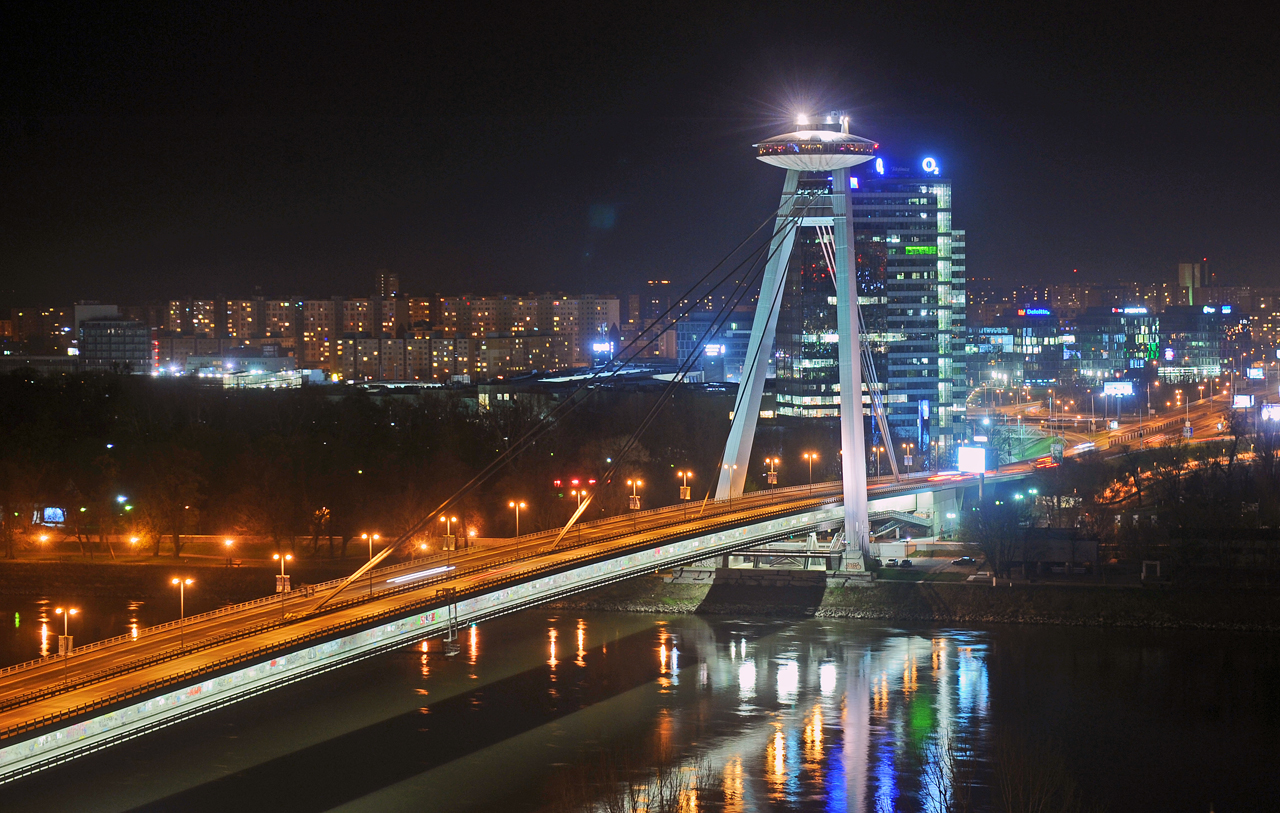
Panoramic view of the bridge at night

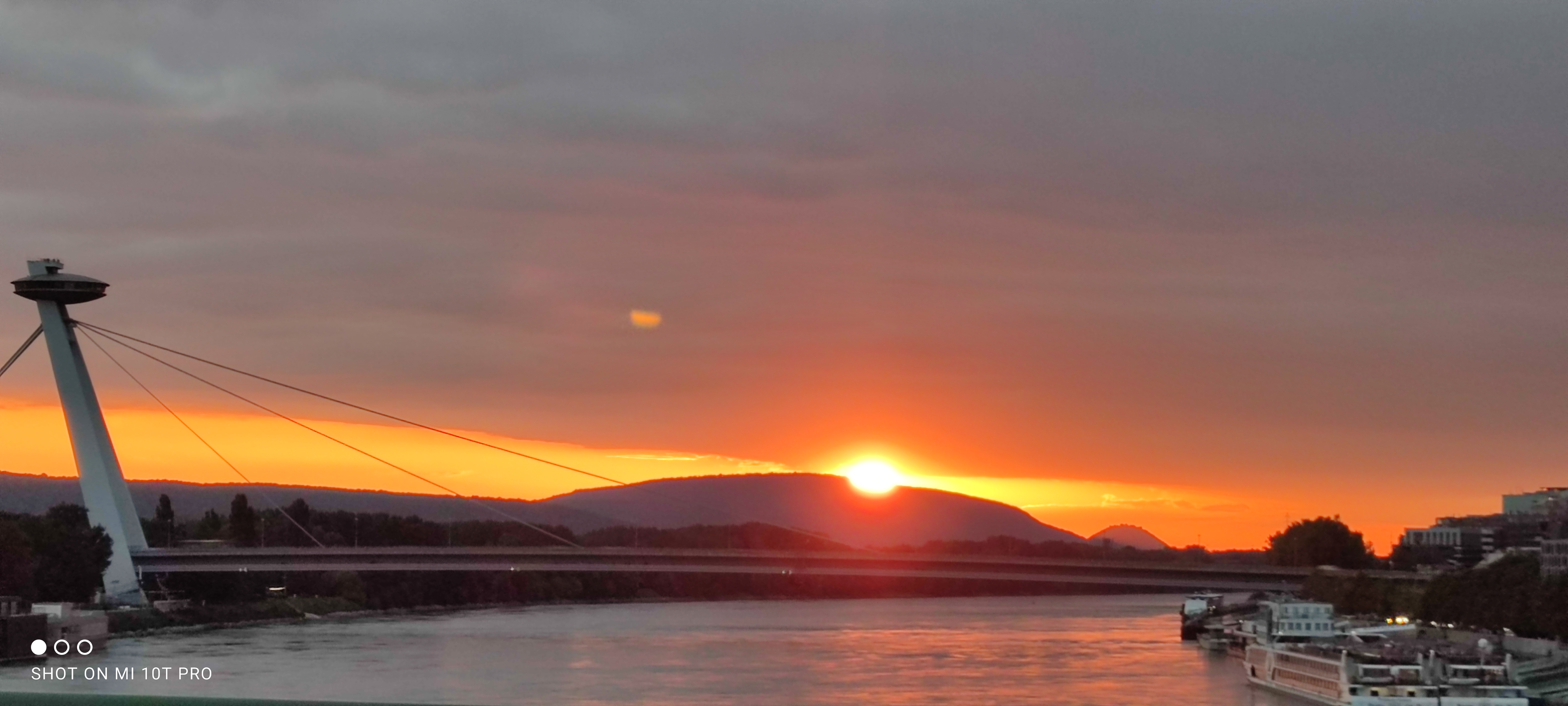
View of the Bridge of the Slovak National Uprising and sunset in Bratislava

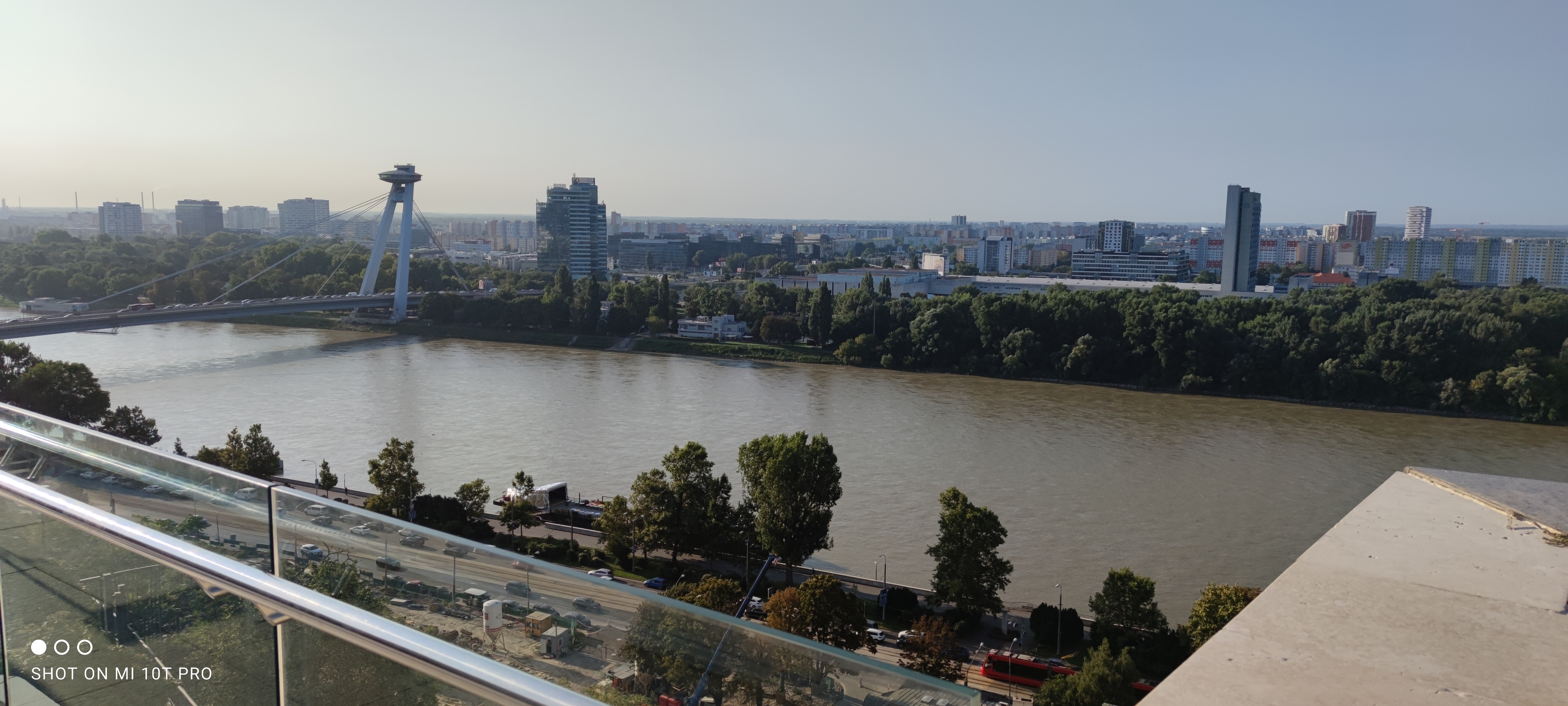
Panoramic view from Bratislava castle

== See also ==
- List of crossings of the Danube River
- List of Towers
- History of Bratislava
