= Friedi Kühne =

German slackliner (born 1989)

Friedrich Paul Kühne
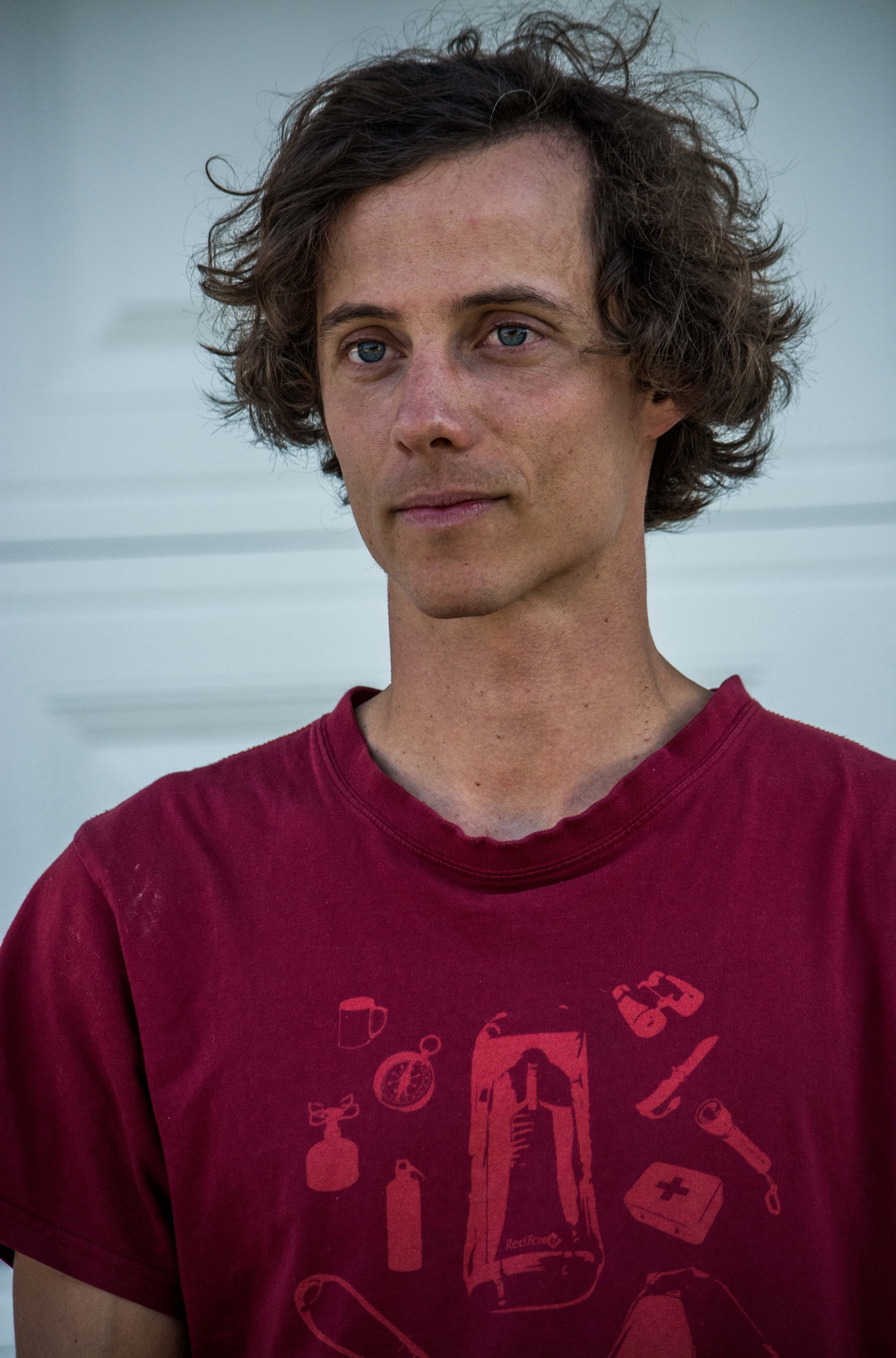
- Friedi Kühne 2018

Personal information
- Nationality: Germany
- Citizenship: Germany
- Born: November 2, 1989 (age 36) Erlangen, Germany
- Education: LMU Munich
- Occupation: professional athletes

Friedrich Paul Kühne (born November 2, 1989) is a German slackliner and multiple highline world record holder best known for numerous first free solo crossings of some of the world's tallest and most renowned highlines. He is also credited with the invention of various acrobatic highline tricks.

== Early life ==
Kühne grew up in Rosenheim, Germany in proximity to the Alps, where he enjoyed skiing, hiking and mountain climbing. As a teenager, he developed an interest in parkour, freerunning, gymnastics, bouldering and rock climbing. At the age of 19, during a climbing trip to Arco in northern Italy, he stood on a slackline for the first time and in his own words became "addicted to this feeling of balance".

== Career ==
=== Tricklining ===
Influenced by his gymnastics background, Kühne began his professional athletic career in tricklining. From 2010 to 2014, he participated in a number of national and international trickline competitions, signed with his first sponsor Elephant Slacklines, and appeared on German television for the first time. In May 2011, Kühne set his first world record by jumping across a 50-meter slackline in one continuous jump combo with his friend Bernd Hassmann. Kühne appeared on the ZDF television program "WETTEN, DASS..." in 2013 for its Christmas edition and wagered that he could extinguish six Christmas candles in a row by surfing back and forth on a slackline without falling and in less than 3.5 minutes. Although he accomplished the task, he took a very close second place by an audience vote at the end of the show.

=== Highlining ===
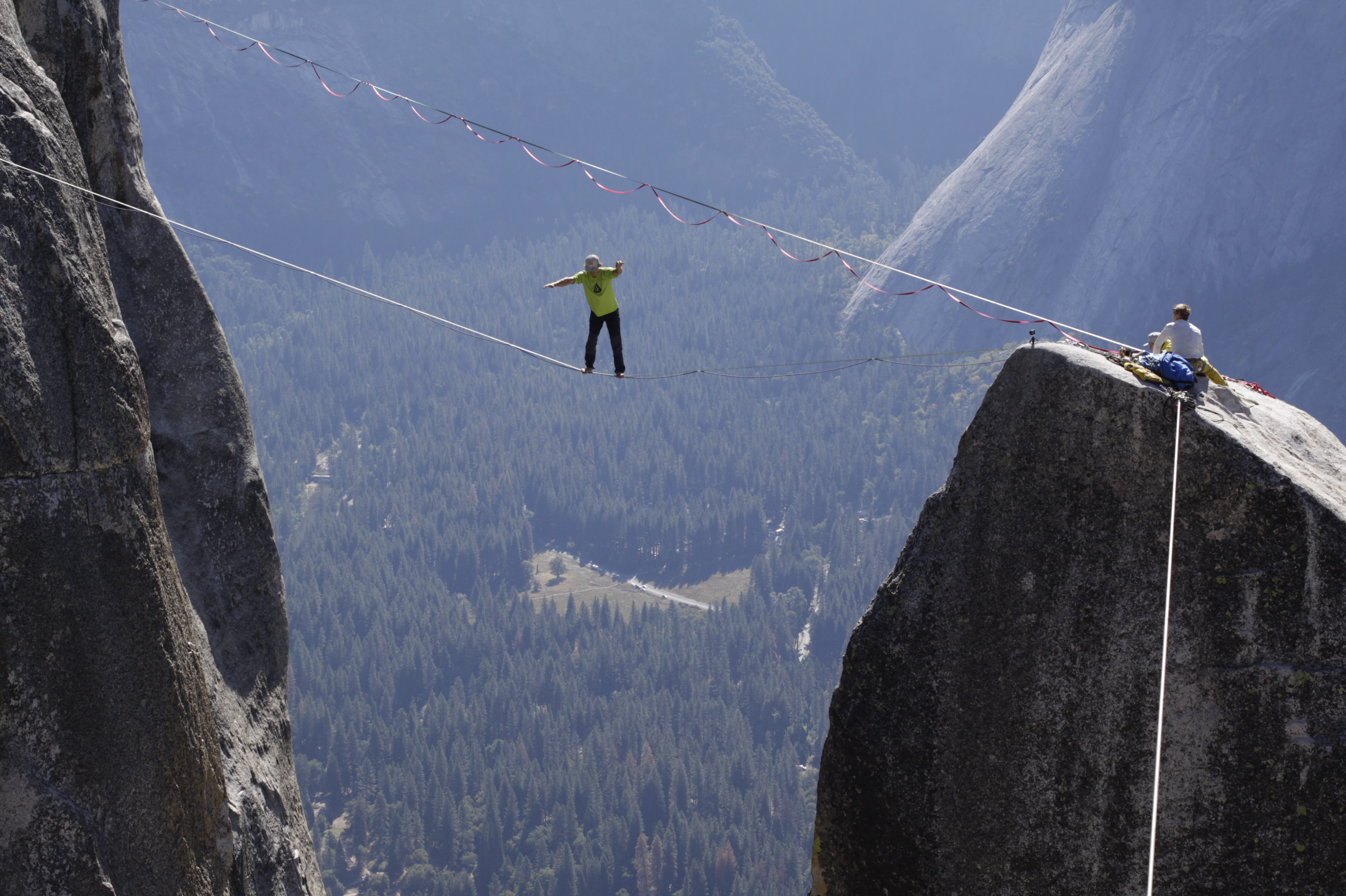
Free Solo on the classic Lost Arrow Spire highline in Yosemite Valley, 2018

Kühne's first highline attempt was across Wolfsschlucht canyon in Neubeuern, where he walked a 25 meters across a 30-meter drop when he was 20 years old. Wolfsschlucht became a regular training location for Kühne and his slacklining colleagues including Lukas Irmler and Julian Mittermaier. Despite his initial strong focus on tricklining, he proceeded to walk more and more highlines in this canyon and the surrounding Alps. After a college exchange year as a language teaching assistant in the United States in 2015, he shifted his professional focus fully to highlining. Kühne achieved a number of world first highline crossings over 100 meters long in popular areas along the Pacific coast such as Yosemite, Squamish, Smith Rock, Leavenworth, Joshua Tree and the Columbia River Gorge. On festivals during this time, Kühne also became friends with prominent American slackliners like Jerry Miszewski, Andy Lewis and Spencer Seabrooke. Kühne set a number of slackline world records between 2015 and today.

=== Free solo ===
Kühne first experimented with free solo highlining by slacklining high over water without a harness. He also attempted swami walks, a method of securement that uses only a small tether around the belly or leg instead of a proper safety harness. Kühne completed his first real untethered highline walk over land in the summer of 2014. He crossed a 25-meter highline in Ostrov, Czech Republic, approximately 20 meters in the air. He walked his first taller and more exposed free solos during his year as a teaching assistant in the USA. Due to the dangerous and controversial nature of free solo highlining, he initially kept his interest in the sport a secret and did not allow his walks to be filmed. In August 2016, Kühne was filmed free soloing for the first time when he crossed a 72-meter-long (236 ft), 400-meter-tall (1,300 ft) highline at Hunlen-Falls, British Columbia. With that crossing, he set the free solo highline world record and for the first time acknowledged his controversial passion publicly.

=== Shows and speeches ===
In the course of his sporting successes, Kühne soon started doing public slackline performances and began a second career as a lecturer. For instance, he balanced at a height of 60m between two church towers over downtown Straubing, at a height of 350m between two skyscrapers in Moscow, and a world record distance of 170m over the Danube, all in front of tens of thousands of spectators. In September 2021, he won third place at the "Discovery Days" lecture festival in Switzerland, and since then has been giving motivational lectures at corporate events and festivals.

== World records and other accomplishments ==
Date	Location	Achievement
May 2011	Munich, Germany	World Record longest jumpline crossing in one continuous combo (50 meters)
February 2012	Munich, Germany	Second place, ISPO Slackline Open
July 2013	Bichlbach, Austria	First place, Austrian trickline cup
December 2013	Augsburg, Germany	Second place, ZDF TV show "WETTEN, DASS..."
May 2014	Straubing, Germany	World Record longest waterline over a strong current (Danube, 121 meters)
July 2014	Vienna, Austria	First place, Austrian Trickline Cup
May 2015	Yosemite, USA	First ascent of the longest highline across the Yosemite-Falls (110 meters)
September 2015	Moléson, Switzerland	World Record longest polyester/low-tech highline (296 meters)
May 2016	Munich, Germany	World Record longest urban highline (Olympiastadion, 153 meters)
June 2016	Straubing, Germany	World Record longest urban highline (169 meters)
June 2016	Karlsruhe, Germany	World Record longest urban highline (190 meters)
August 2016	Hunlen Falls, Canada	World Record longest FREE SOLO highline (72 meters long, 400 meters high)
October 2016	Saint-Jeannet, France	World Record longest polyester / low-tech highline (800 meters)
May 2017	Saint-Jeannet, France	Crossing of the longest and heaviest highline in the world (1600 meters long; continuous walk 1500 meters)
September 2017	Verdon, France	World Record longest free solo highline (110 meters long, 250 meters high; world record still standing as of 5 May 2020)
September 2018	Senja, Norway	Crossing of the longest highline in the world (2800 meters long; continuous walk 2200 meters)
September 2018	Asbestos, Canada	World Record longest highline (1900 meters) with Anthony Hotte, Anthony Boulay, Guillaume Fontaine, Mia Noblet (all Canada) and Samuel Volery (Switzerland)
May 2019	Kislodvodsk, Russia	World Record longest highline walk while blindfolded (975 meters; world record still standing as of 5 May 2020) with Lukas Irmler
September 2019	Moscow, Russia	World Record highest urban highline (220 meters long, 350 meters high; world record still standing as of 5 May 2020) with Alexander Gribanov, Maxim Kagin, Vladimir Murzaev, Gennady Skripko (all Russia), Mia Noblet (Canada), and Nathan Paulin (France)
July 2021	Lapporten, Sweden	World Record longest highline walk (2130 meters long, 500 meters high; world record still standing as of July 25, 2021)
November 2024	Rosenheim, Germany	World Record highest highline walk (2580m high above ground, suspended between two hot air balloons; world record still standing as of April 25, 2025)https://www.youtube.com/watch?v=3zrBLh44m7U

== Personal life ==
Kühne finished his high school education with the Abitur at Karolinen-Gymnasium Rosenheim in 2009. After nine months of civilian service at Caritas Wendelstein Werkstätten in Rosenheim, he started studying for a high school teaching degree in English and Mathematics at LMU Munich in 2010. He graduated from the university in Fall 2017 and has lived in Bad Aibling since, dedicating most of his time and energy to slacklining.
