= Jaan Roose =

Estonian slackliner (born 1992)

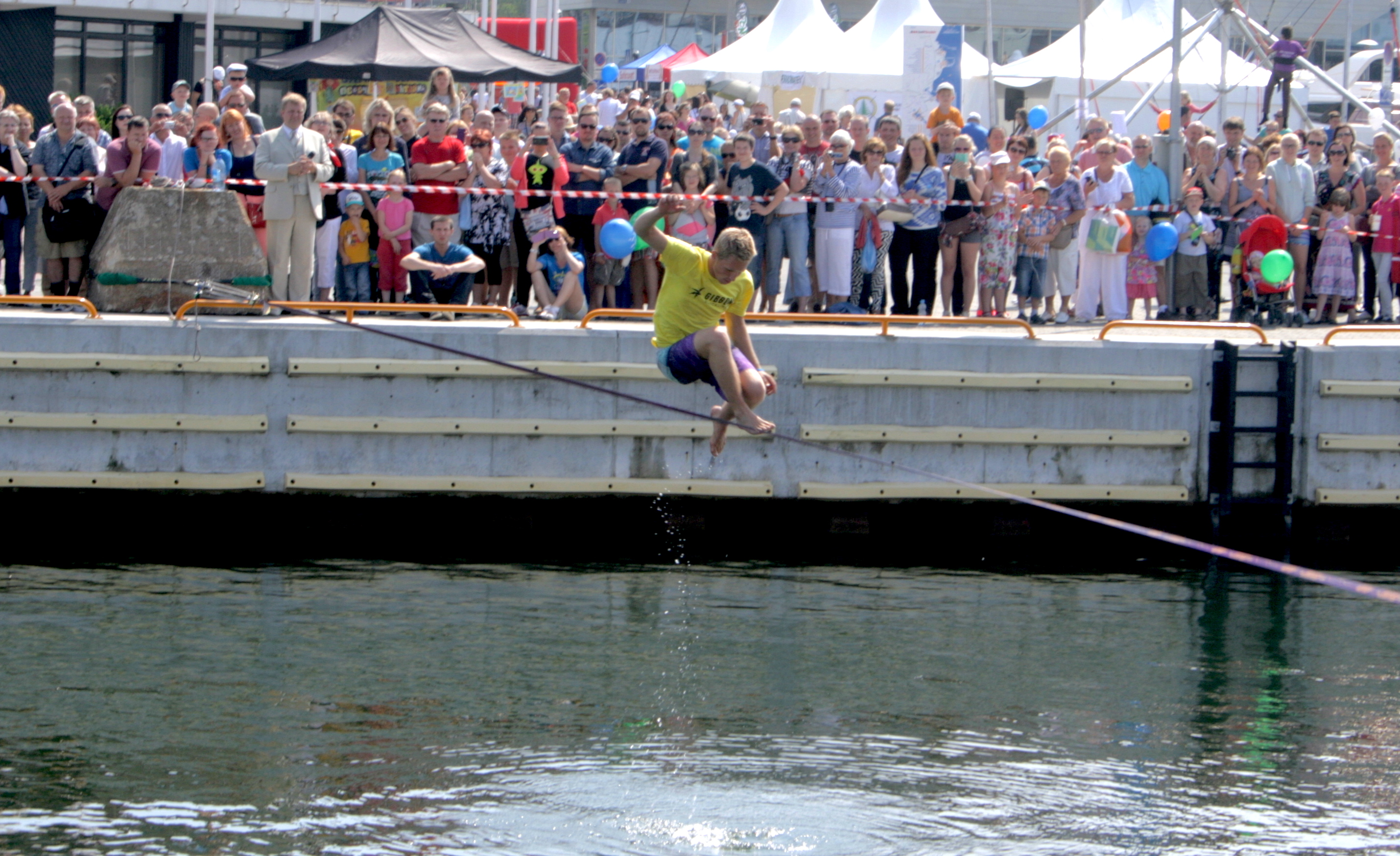

Personal information
- Born: 11 January 1992 (age 34) Võru County, Estonia

Sport
- Country: Estonia
- Sport: slacklining

Jaan Roose (born 11 January 1992) is an Estonian slackliner.

== Career ==
On 23 June 2023, Roose broke the world record by walking the longest single-building slackline, across one of Qatar's Katara Towers, at a height of over 185 metres.

On 10 July 2024, he was the first person to walk across Italy's Strait of Messina. He beat the existing Guinness World Record of 2,710 metres (8,890 ft).

On 18 September 2026, Roose set a world record by covering 14.7 kilometres, suspended 100 metres above ground, walking back and forth on a narrow slackline stretched between the UFO observation tower on SNP Bridge and Bratislava Castle in Slovakia for twelve hours.

Roose has also appeared as a stuntman in several films, including Assassin's Creed (2016), Wonder Woman 1984 (2020), and Melchior the Apothecary (2022). He also worked as a slackline artist for Madonna during her 2012 MDNA World Tour.

== Personal life ==
Roose was born in Võru County and raised in the village of Matsuri, Setomaa Parish.
