= Giovanna Petrucci =

Brazilian athletics competitor (born 1998)

Personal information
- Citizenship: Brazil
- Born: 1998 (age 27–28)
- Occupation: Slackliner

Giovanna Petrucci is a Brazilian athlete from Rio de Janeiro notable for being a champion slackliner. This relatively new sport is performed on a thin strap of nylon or polyester, five centimeters wide, suspended under tension between two trees or poles, over land or sand or water. Tension on the slackline is maintained with ratchets strong enough to support the weight of the slackliner, like having a thin trampoline only a few centimeters wide. Petrucci propels herself airborne to perform tricks such as jumps and somersaults, sometimes called trickling, as well as front and back flips and dismounts. According to a report in The New York Times, she is credited with being the first to do a complex combination of aerial moves termed a fearless. She has performed at the beach at Ipanema as well as above a river, and has competed internationally. In 2013, she was described as the current Brazilian champion in the sport.
