= Entertainment Technology Partners =

- Company type: Private company
- Industry: Audiovisual Technology
- Founded: 2014
- Founder: Les Goldberg
- Headquarters: 2350 Investors Row, Orlando, Florida, US 32837
- Number of locations: 12
- Key people: Les Goldberg (Chairman); David John (President, Chief Operating Officer); Paul Hutton (President, ETP Europe)
- Brands: LMG LLC, EventEQ, CoiL, Pixl Evolution
- Services: Audio, Visual, LED, Lighting
- Number of employees: >400
- Website: www.etp.net

Entertainment Technology Partners (ETP) is a global multi-brand entertainment technology company headquartered in Orlando. As of January 2018, the firm owns four audiovisual technology companies: LMG, LLC, EventEQ Maryland, EventEQ Pennsylvania (formerly ChoiceLIVE), Systems Innovation, and Pixl Evolution. ETP has 10 locations throughout the United States and Europe and over 425 employees.

== Brands ==
- LMG
- LMG Touring & Entertainment
- Systems Innovation
- EventEQ
- The CoiL Learning Center
- Pixl Evolution
- knw.
