= Andy Lewis (slackliner) =

American athlete and stunt coordinator (1986–2026)

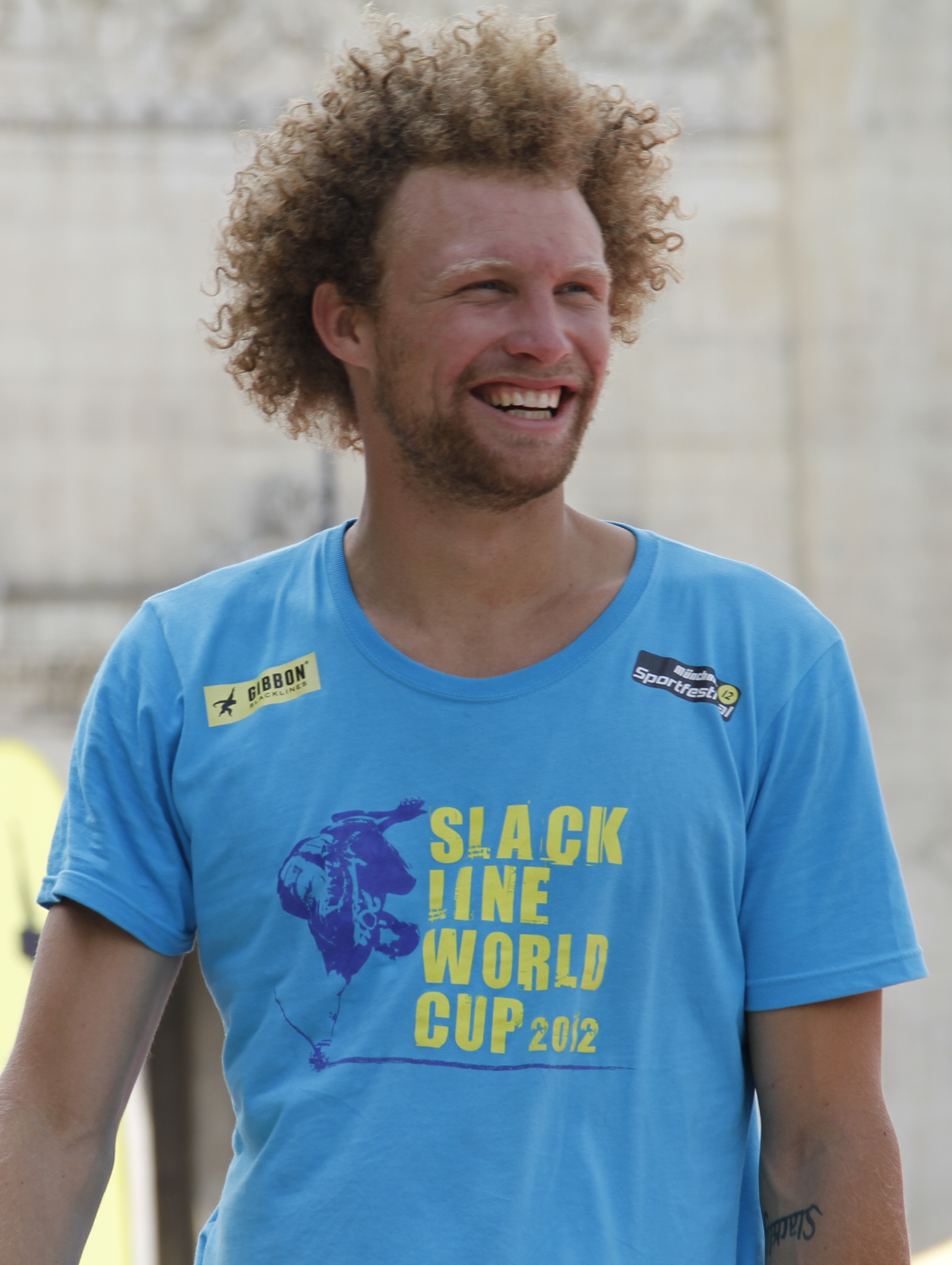
- Lewis in 2012

Personal information
- Nickname: Sketchy Andy
- Nationality: United States
- Born: October 7, 1986 Santa Rosa, California, U.S.
- Died: June 14, 2026 (aged 39) Mineral Bottom, near Moab, Utah, U.S.

Sport
- Sport: Slacklining; BASE jumping

Andy Lewis (October 7, 1986 – June 14, 2026), nicknamed "Sketchy Andy", was an American slackliner, highliner, stunt performer, and adventure-sports business owner and technician. He became an overnight celebrity when he appeared onstage in Madonna's 2012 Super Bowl half-time show. He was the owner and operator of BASE Jump Moab, an extreme adventure outfitter and guide company offering professional access to canyoning, rock climbing, rappelling, rope swings, and tandem BASE jumping.

== Early life ==
Born on October 7, 1986, in Santa Rosa, California, Lewis grew up in Greenbrae, California, and moved to Moab, Utah, in the 2000s.

== Career ==
=== Early career ===
Lewis began slacklining in the mid-2000s and quickly emerged in the competitive and performance-oriented branches of the sport, with an early focus on tricklining and highlining. He gained international recognition through participation in major competitions, including the GIBBON Trickline World Cup.

=== Mainstream attention ===
Lewis gained international exposure in 2012 after appearing as a slackline performer during the Super Bowl XLVI halftime show, which was headlined by Madonna. The film Sketchy Andy was shown at the European Outdoor Film Tour 2012.

In 2011, Lewis set a certified performance record recognized by Guinness World Records for the most side surfs performed on a slackline in one minute after performing the movement 143 times in 60 seconds.

In October 2013, Lewis completed what was reported as a record-length urban highline walk between towers of the Mandalay Bay on the Las Vegas Strip, approximately 480 feet above ground.

In 2014, Lewis did a series of illegal BASE jumps in Arches National Park. Lewis was fined $965 and was prohibited from entering any U.S. national park for 18 months.

=== Later career ===
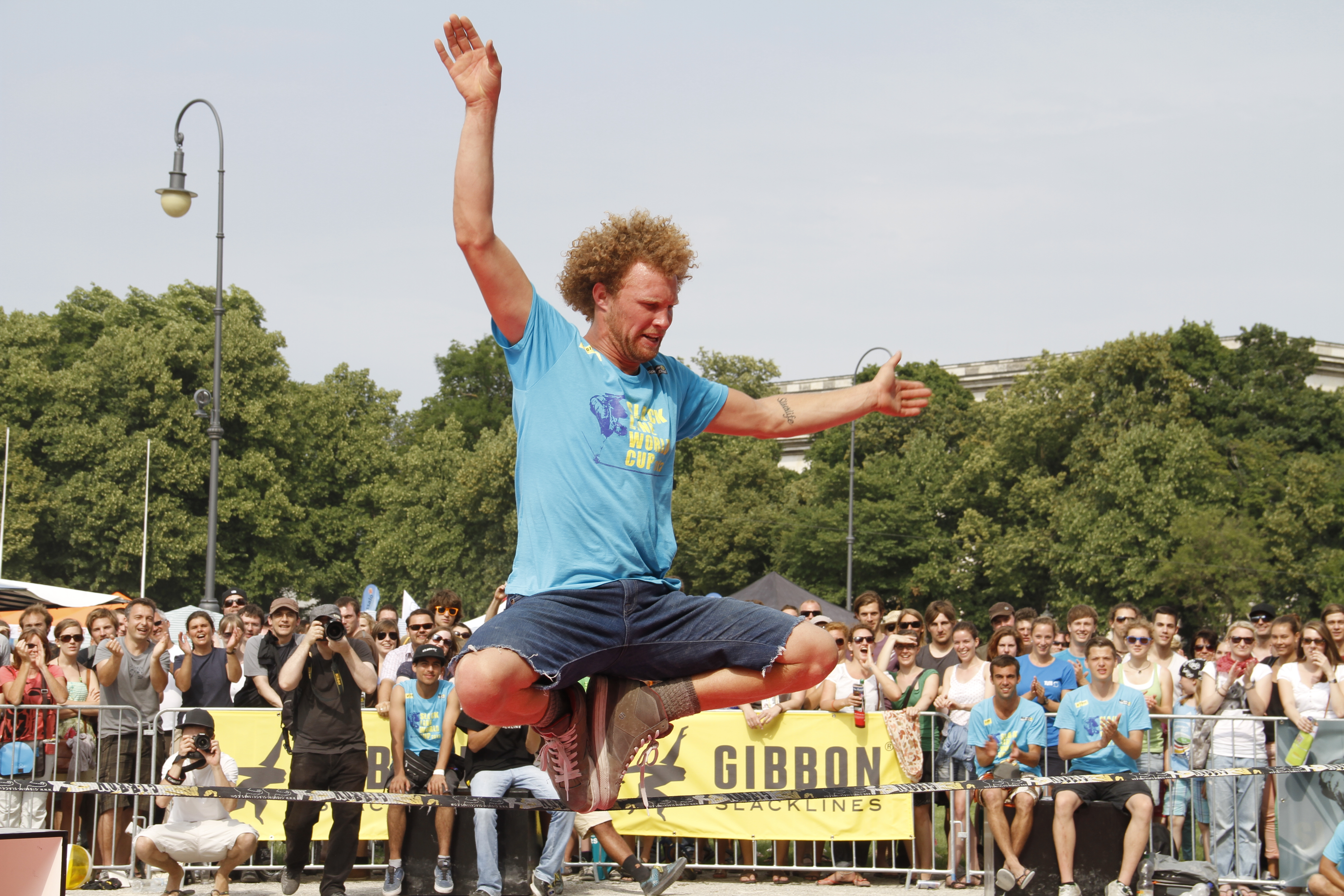
Lewis performing a tip stand in Munich, Germany, 2012

From the late 2010s, Lewis focused increasingly on instruction, technical operations, and safety management in adventure and aerial sports in addition to performance work. Beginning in 2018, he was involved in commercial tandem BASE-jump operations at his company BASE Jump Moab located in Moab, Utah. His responsibilities included participant guidance, flight and exit coordination, and technical and safety oversight.

In addition to his competitive career, Lewis participated in highlining projects in which he personally scouted, rigged, and crossed routes that had previously been attempted by others. These projects included a 55-metre line in California ("Ruin's Highline"), a 60-metre line in France ("King Line"), and a 100-metre line in Moab, Utah ("Afrodisiac"), which was reported at the time as the first highline of that length.

He completed more than 100 crossings free-solo highlining without the use of a safety leash. In 2018, he completed an 888 m (2,913 ft) onsight leashed highline, one of the longest documented crossings achieved on a first attempt.

== Death ==
Lewis, 39, and businessman Danny Joe Kregle, 68, were fatally injured in a tandem BASE jumping accident in Mineral Bottom near Moab, Utah, on June 14, 2026.
