= Slacklining =

Sport

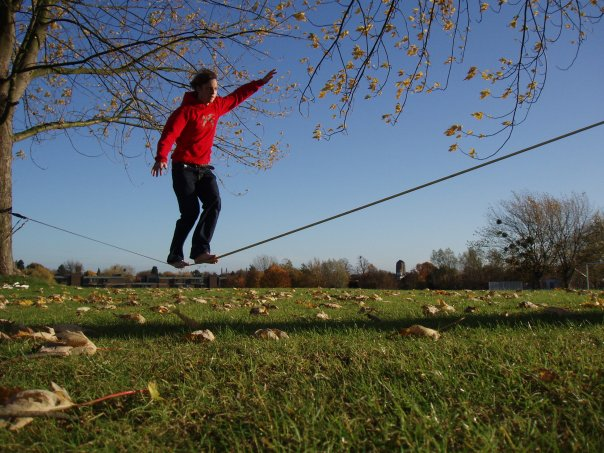
Slacklining

Slacklining is walking, running or balancing along a suspended length of flat webbing that is tensioned between two anchors. Slacklining is similar to slack rope walking and tightrope walking. Slacklines differ from tightwires and tightropes in the type of material used and the amount of tension applied during use. Slacklines are tensioned significantly less than tightropes or tightwires in order to create a dynamic line which will stretch and bounce like a long and narrow trampoline. Tension can be adjusted to suit the user, and different webbing may be used in various circumstances. When a person slacklines, they typically use their arms to balance when the center of mass is displaced.

== Styles of slacklining ==
=== Tricklining ===
Tricklining has become the most common form of slacklining because of the easy setup of 2-inch (5 cm) slackline kits. Tricklining is often done low to the ground but can be done on highlines as well. A great number of tricks can be done on the line, and because the sport is fairly new, there is plenty of room for new tricks. Some of the basic tricks done today are walking, walking backwards, turns, dropping knee, running and jumping onto the slackline to start walking, and bounce walking. Some intermediate tricks include: Buddha sit, sitting down, lying down, cross-legged knee drop, surfing forward, surfing sideways, and jumping turns, or "180s". Some of the advanced tricks are: jumps, tree plants, jumping from line-to-line, 360s, butt bounces, and chest bounces. With advancements in webbing technology and tensioning systems, the limits of what can be done on a slackline are being pushed constantly. It is not uncommon to see expert slackliners incorporating flips and twists into slackline trick combinations.

=== Highlining ===
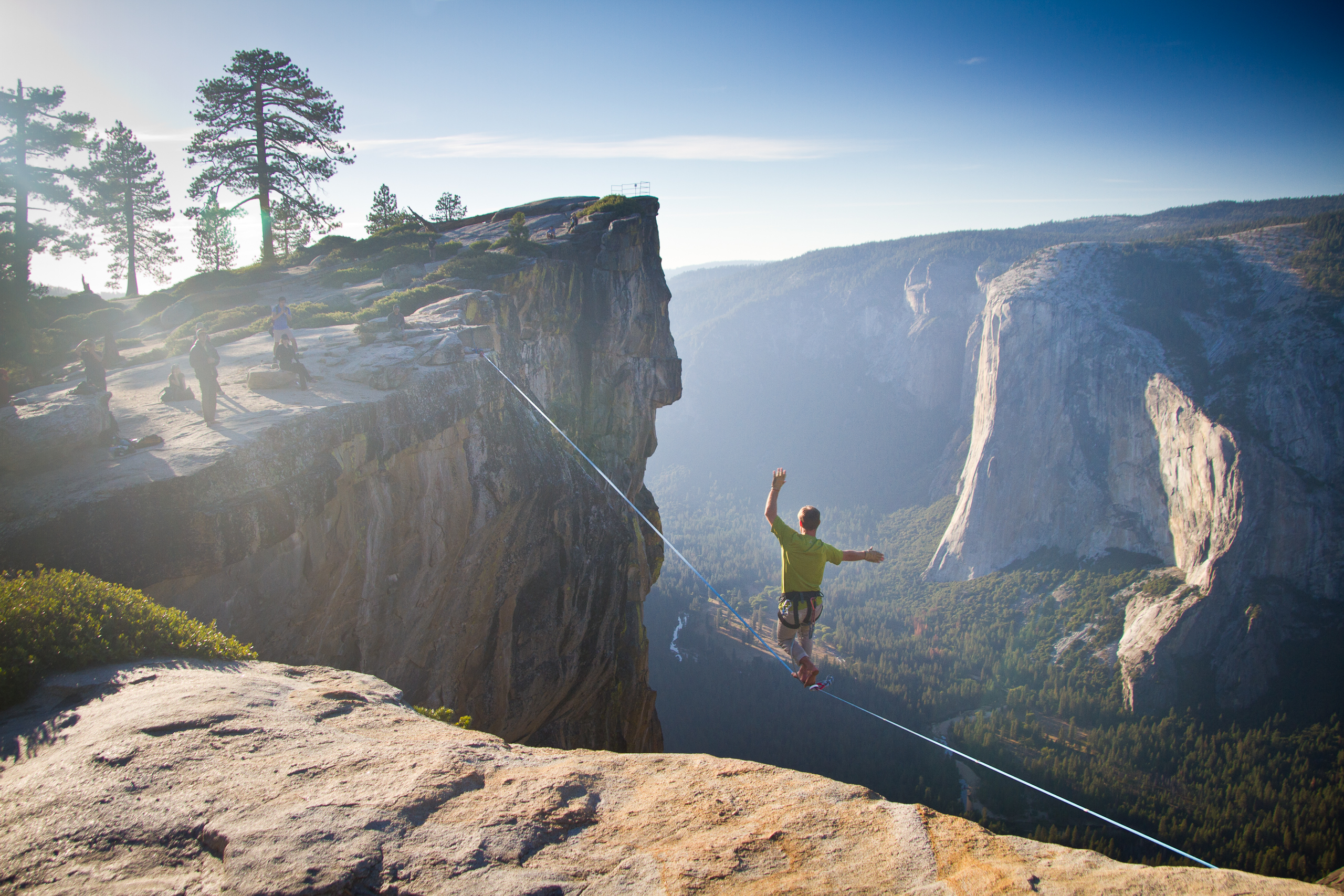
Man highlining at Taft Point in Yosemite National Park with El Capitan in the background.

Highlining is slacklining at an elevation above the ground or water. Many slackliners consider highlining to be the pinnacle of the sport. Highlines are commonly set up in locations that have been used or are still used for Tyrolean traverse. When rigging highlines, experienced slackers take measures to ensure that solid, redundant and equalized anchors are used to secure the line into position. Modern highline rigging typically entails a mainline of webbing, backup webbing, and either climbing rope or ultra-high-molecular-weight polyethylene rope for redundancy. However, many highlines are rigged with a mainline and backup only, especially if the highline is low tension (less than 4,000 N (900 lbf)), or rigged with high quality webbing like Type 18 or MKII Spider Silk. It is also common to pad all areas of the rigging which might come into contact with abrasive surfaces. To ensure safety, most highliners wear a climbing harness or swami belt with a leash attached to the slackline itself. Leash-less, or "free-solo" slacklining – a term loosely taken from rockclimbing ("free" refers to free of aid equipment vs free from the slackline) – is not unheard of, however, with proponents such as Dean Potter and Andy Lewis.

=== Rodeolines ===
Rodeolining is the art and practice of cultivating balance on a piece of rope or webbing draped in slack between two anchor points, typically about 15 to 30 feet (455 to 915 cm) apart and 2 to 3 feet (60 to 90 cm) off the ground in the center. This type of very "slack" slackline provides a wide array of opportunities for both swinging and static maneuvers. A rodeoline has no tension in it, while both traditional slacklines and tightropes are tensioned. This slackness in the rope or webbing allows it to swing at large amplitudes and adds a different dynamic. This form of slacklining first came into popularity in 1999, through a group of students from Colby College in Waterville, Maine. It was first written about on a website called the "Vultures Peak Center for Freestyle and Rodeo Slackline Research" in 2004. The article "Old Revolution—New Recognition - 3-10-04" describes these early developments in detail.

=== Urbanlining ===
Urbanlining or urban slacklining combines all the different styles of slacklining. It is practiced in urban areas, for example in city parks and on the streets. Many urban slackliners prefer wide 2-inch (5 cm) lines for tricklining on the streets, but some use narrow (5/8 or 1 inch, 1.6 or 2.5 cm) lines for longline purposes or for waterlining.

One type of urbanlining is timelining, where one tries to stay on a slackline for as long as possible without falling down. This takes focus of will, and is great endurance training for postural muscles.

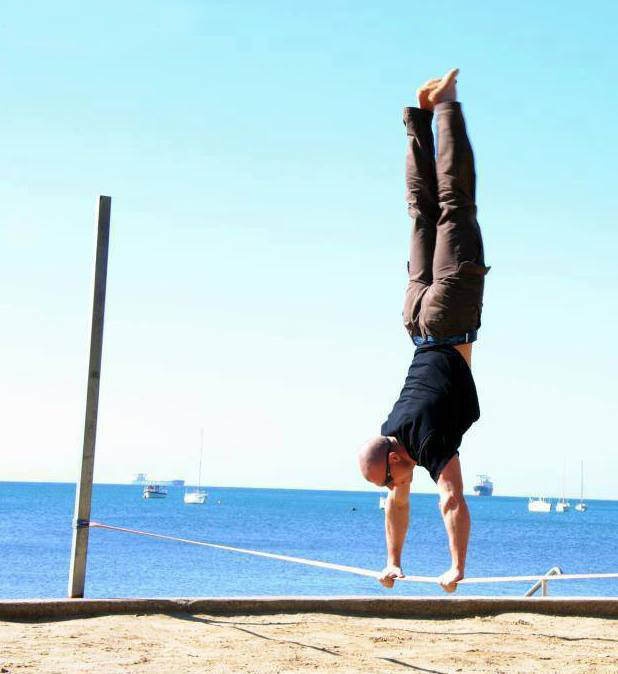
Slackline handstand

Another type of urbanlining is streetlining, which combines street workout power moves with the slackline's dynamic, shaky, bouncy feeling. The main aspects include static handstands, super splits—hands and feet together, planche, front lever, back lever, one arm handstand and other unusual extreme moves that are evolving in street workout culture.

== History ==
While rope walking has been around in one manner or another for thousands of years, the origins of modern-day slacklining are generally attributed to a rock climber named Adam Grosowsky from southern Illinois in 1976 when he was 16. In 2012 a slackline performance by Andy Lewis was featured as part of the halftime show by Madonna. It got attention during the 2016 Rio Olympics when slackliner Giovanna Petrucci performed on the beach at Ipanema, attracting the attention of The New York Times.

A professional slackliner was credited with climbing a ski lift tower in Colorado and shimmying across a cable to save a man caught by a ski lift in January 2017.

=== Highlining history ===
Highlining was inspired by highwire artists. The first successful highline walk is credited to 20-year-old Scott Balcom and 17-year-old Chris Carpenter, who performed the first documented walk on a nylon webbing highline. This highline, now referred to as 'The Arches', was approximately 30 feet (9 m) long and 120 feet (35 m) high located in Pasadena, California. On July 13, 1985, Scott Balcom successfully crossed the Lost Arrow Spire highline. In 1995, Darrin Carter performed unprotected crossings of the Lost Arrow Spire in Yosemite and The Fins, in Tucson, Arizona, on Mt. Lemmon highway. On July 16, 2007, Libby Sauter became the first woman to successfully cross the Lost Arrow Spire. In 2008, Dean Potter became the first person to BASE jump from a highline at Hell Roaring Canyon in Utah.

== World records ==
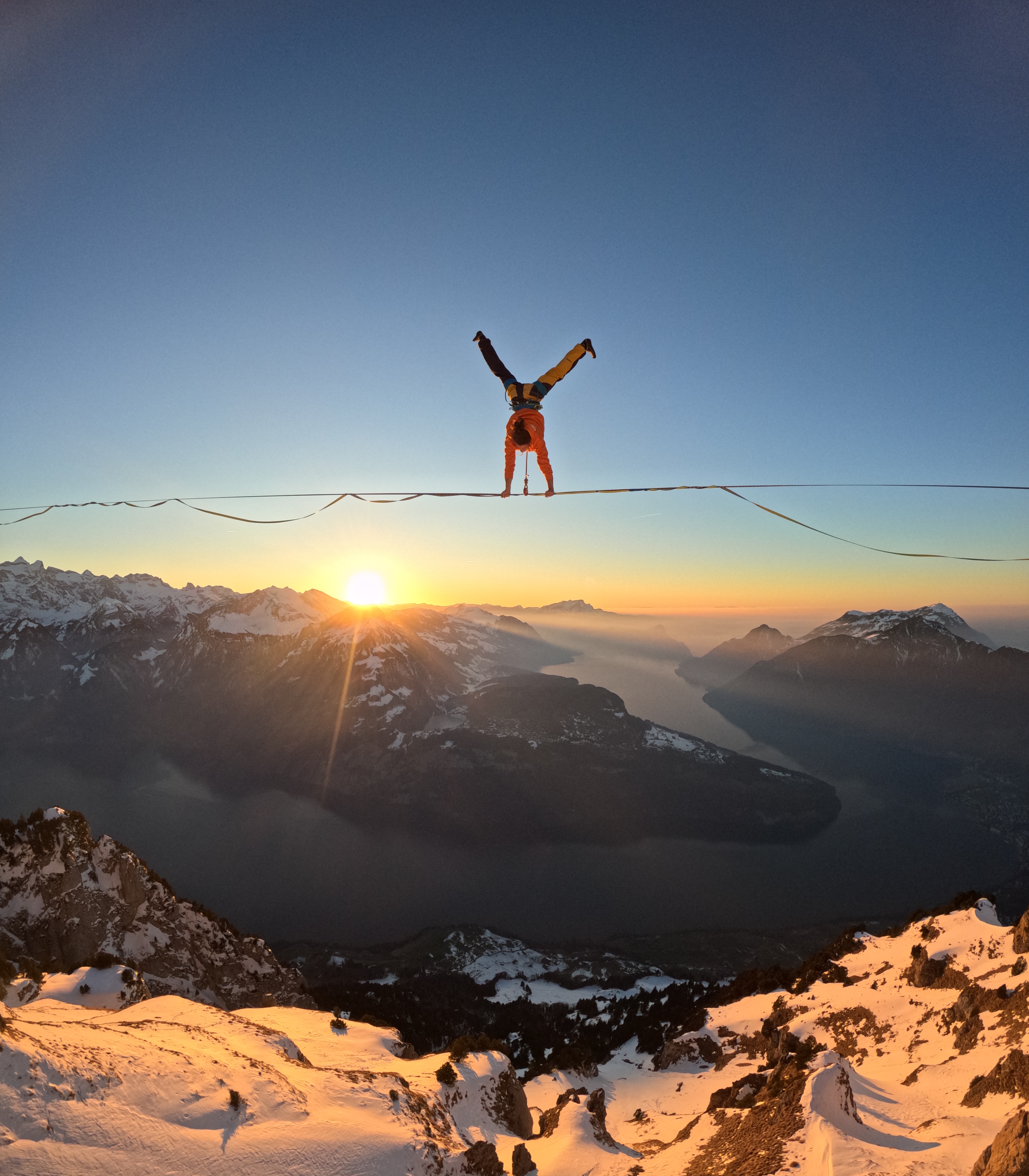
Handstand on a highline by Samuel Vollery

=== Longest highline ===
The record was set by four athletes between July 4 and July 6, 2021. Friedi Kühne, Lukas Irmler, Quirin Herterich and Ruben Langer (all from Germany) crossed a 2.1-kilometre (1.3 mi) slackline suspended more than 500 metres (1,600 ft) high between the Lapporten mountains near Abisko, Sweden. All of them walked this line from beginning to end without falling, taking times from approximately 70–180 minutes.

On 10 July 2024, Jaan Roose narrowly missed a world's record despite a 3.6 kilometres (2.2 mi) crossing in the Strait of Messina.

=== Longest free solo highline ===
At a length of 110 meters (120 yards) and a height of 200 m (218 yards), the longest free solo highline was walked at the Verdon Gorge in Southern France by German Slackliner Friedi Kühne. The longest free solo highline by a female is held by Lucia Bryn, who walked a 33-meter-long (36 yard) highline in Yosemite, California, USA, on 7 July 2022. The line was 80 meters (86 yards) high.

=== Highest slackline ===
The highest slackline on record was walked by Christian Schou on August 3, 2006, at Kjerag in Rogaland, Norway. The slackline was 1,000 metres (3,281 ft) high. The project was repeated by Aleksander Mork in September 2007. Rafael Zugno Bridi currently holds the world record who walked a slackline between two hot air balloons.

In 2015, Stephan Siegrist performed a slackline walk in the summit area of Mount Kilimanjaro at an altitude exceeding 5,500 meters above sea level.

The current world record for the highest urban highline is held by Friedi Kühne, Mia Noblet, Gennady Skripko, Vladimir Murzaev, Maksim Kagin, Alexander Gribanov, and Nathan Paulin. All seven athletes managed to walk a 220 m-long, 350 m-high slackline between Oko Tower and Neva Tower 2 in Moscow, on September 7, 2019.

=== Longest slackline (longline) ===
The longest slackline walked by a woman, with a length of 305 metres (1,001 ft), was walked by Annalisa Casiraghi across a field in Schüpberg near Bern, Switzerland. The previous record had been set in September 2014 by Laetitia Gonnon, who walked 230 m (754 ft 7.1 in) in Lausanne, Switzerland.

=== Longest blindfolded slackline walk ===
On 28 April 2019 in Kislovodsk, Russia, Friedi Kühne and Lukas Irmler from Germany walked a 975 m-long, 200 m-high slackline entirely with their eyes closed, ensuring this with a blindfold strapped over their eyes. Thus they broke the world record for the longest blindfolded slackline walk.

== Incidents and risks ==
The International Slackline Association (ISA) began tracking accidents and incidents of the sport in 2009. As with other extreme sports, slacklining carries risks, and participants have experienced injuries and death as a result. As of 2025, the ISA has recorded 10 highline deaths and 3 trickline deaths. Two of the trickline fatalities were suffered by bystanders. Longline, waterline and Starter kit accidents have resulted in one death per activity. Other risks are associated with slacklining that are not tracked by the organization. They include deaths that have occurred while scouting routes, or falls while approaching highline anchors. Slacklines have been banned in some municipalities for their propensity to damage trees and structures.

Highlines have also been demonstrated to be a hazard to low level aviation.

Some notable slacklining incidents include:

- 02 January 2026 - an MD Helicopters 369FF carrying 4 struck a highline/slackline at approximately 600 ft above the ground near Superior, Arizona, USA causing the tailboom to separate, and the fuselage to invert and impact the ground. All 4 occupants were killed.
- 16 May 2025 – a 22-year-old Canadian highliner died after falling 80 m at a highline gathering near Squamish, B.C. She reportedly had untied herself from her highline and forgot to re-tie her leash.
- 15 July 2022 – a 4-year-old child died when the tree that he was slacklining from fell on top of him in Jefferson County, Colorado.
- 25 August 2013 – a 24-year-old cyclist died when they ran into an unattended slackline on the campus of Utah State University. In 2015, California Polytechnic State University, San Luis Obispo regulated slacklining on campus in an effort to protect trees and students in response to this incident.

== See also ==
- Jultagi
