= LMG, LLC =

LMG, LLC is an American provider of video, audio, LED, and lighting services for live events. The company was founded in 1984 by Les M. Goldberg and operates as a subsidiary of Entertainment Technology Partners (ETP). LMG's divisions include Systems Innovation by LMG, LMG Touring & Entertainment, and LMG Venues.

== History ==
LMG was founded by Les M. Goldberg in March 1984 to support audiovisual rentals for corporate meetings and live events. The company launched a systems integration division in 1993, later rebranded as Systems Innovation in 2019, to provide permanent audiovisual installation and design services.

In 1998, LMG became the onsite audiovisual provider at the Orange County Convention Center (OCCC) in Orlando, Florida, establishing a long-term partnership that continues today.

In 2005, LMG developed its first high-definition “truck in a box” production system, known as HD-1, designed for corporate shows and later expanded with additional units built around the Snell & Wilcox Kahuna broadcast switcher.

In 2007, LMG launched its Touring & Entertainment division, which has since provided video, lighting, and audio support for major concert tours and live music productions.

In 2013, the company was awarded the audiovisual services contract for the Music City Center in Nashville, Tennessee, and the following year renewed its Orange County Convention Center partnership for a fourth consecutive term.

Also in 2014, Goldberg established Entertainment Technology Partners to unite LMG and other event technology brands under a single parent company. That same year, LMG introduced one of the first fully mobile 4K Ultra HD production systems for corporate events.

In subsequent years, the company expanded nationwide, acquiring AV-Integrators in 2018 to establish a Northern California presence, and launching LMG Venues in 2022 to support convention centers and hospitality spaces across the U.S.

In 2023, Goldberg published his third book, The Show Must Go On: The Art of Leading Through a Crisis, and in 2025, LMG expanded its Las Vegas operations with a new 52,000-square-foot climate-controlled LED warehouse complementing its existing facility.

== Founder ==
Les M. Goldberg is the chief executive officer, president, and founder of LMG, LLC, and serves as chairman of Entertainment Technology Partners. He established the company at age 17 and has authored several books on leadership and business in the live events industry.

Goldberg was recognized as one of Orlando Business Journal’s Top 40 Under 40 honorees in both 1998 and 2005.

== Brands ==
LMG offers full-service video, audio, and lighting throughout the United States for corporate meetings, trade shows, live broadcasts, and specialty events.

LMG Touring & Entertainment provides integrated audio, video, lighting, and satellite web streaming for concert tours.

LMG Systems Innovation provides consultation, design, and installation of permanent audiovisual solutions.

LMG Venues provides audio, video, lighting, and LED capabilities in convention centers and venues across the United States for corporate meetings, trade shows, live broadcasts, and specialty events.
