= Aupark Bratislava =

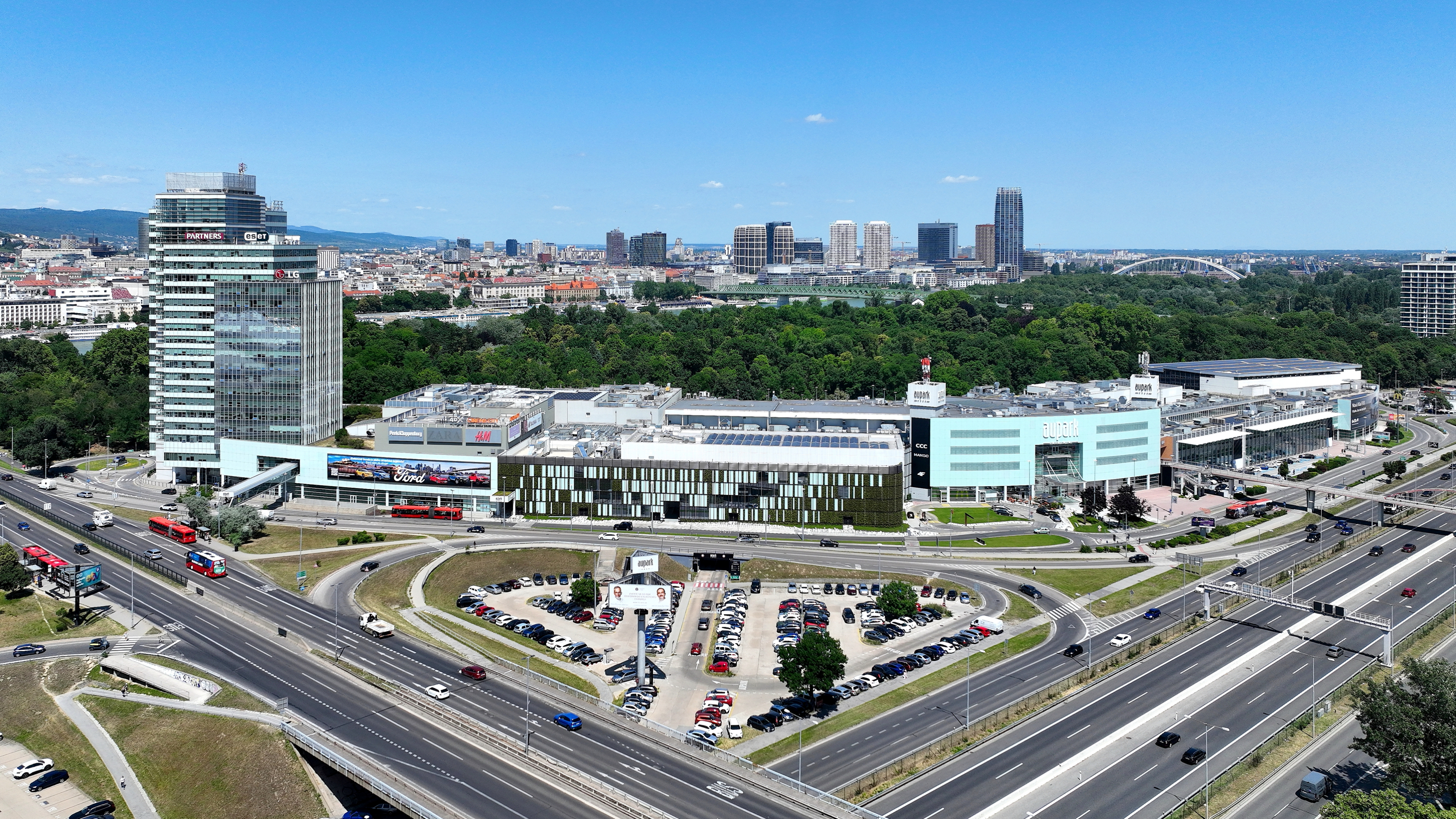
- Aupark and Aupark Tower
- Location: Petržalka, Bratislava, Slovakia
- Coordinates: 48.132928°N 17.107944°E
- Address: Einsteinova Street No. 18
- Opened: 15 November 2001
- Owner: Unibail-Rodamco
- Num. of stores: 249
- Floor area: 58,000 square metres (624,306.8 sq ft)
- Floors: 3
- Parking: Underground garage (646 spaces), adjacent parking house (653 spaces), outside parking lot (480 spaces)
- Website: Aupark Bratislava

Aupark was also a former name of Sad Janka Kráľa public park.

Aupark is a shopping centre (shopping mall and entertainment centre) in the Petržalka borough of Bratislava, Slovakia. It was the second major modern shopping centre built in Bratislava, Polus City Center being the first. At the time it opened on 15 November 2001, it was the biggest shopping mall in Slovakia with total shopping space of 44,000 m^{2}.

Aupark is situated next to Nový most bridge, beside Sad Janka Kráľa public park, formerly known also as Aupark, not far from the river Danube. It is accessible by car or public bus.

== History ==
The area of the shopping mall was previously occupied by residential houses of the former Old Petržalka village. The area contained the following streets: Pri sade Street, Platanová Street, Dostihová Street and Koševého Street, all demolished before 1989.

Aupark shopping mall was constructed by the Slovak company HB Reavis from 2000 to 2001, it was opened on 15 Novembra 2001 and the first phase of construction was finished in the Spring of 2002. In 2006, Unibail-Rodamco acquired approximately half of Aupark for the sum of 75 million EUR. In 2005, Aupark briefly contained an aquapark with an area of 4 700 meters squared, the first in Bratislava. It was located on the roof and part of the second floor of the shopping center. Second phase of Aupark construction commenced in January 2006, consisting of an enlargement of the shopping mall at the place of parking spaces next to Sad Janka Kráľa and a construction of a high-rise commercial building nearby. These buildings opened on 23. August 2007. After enlargement, Aupark comprised 58,000 m^{2} of total space, as well as 12 cinema theatres in a multiplex cinema Palace Cinemas.

In 2011, Unibail-Roadmco acquired the rest of Aupark from HB Revis together with a neighboring empty lot for 151 million EUR. Between 2013 and 2015 Aupark was modernised for 40 million EUR, with the biggest changes made to the underground passage, main lobby and the food courts and cafes. Glass floor stairs in the main lobby were replaced by escalators and the interior fountain was changed.

== See also ==
- Aupark Tower
