= Caroline Augusta Bridge =

Bridge in Slovakia

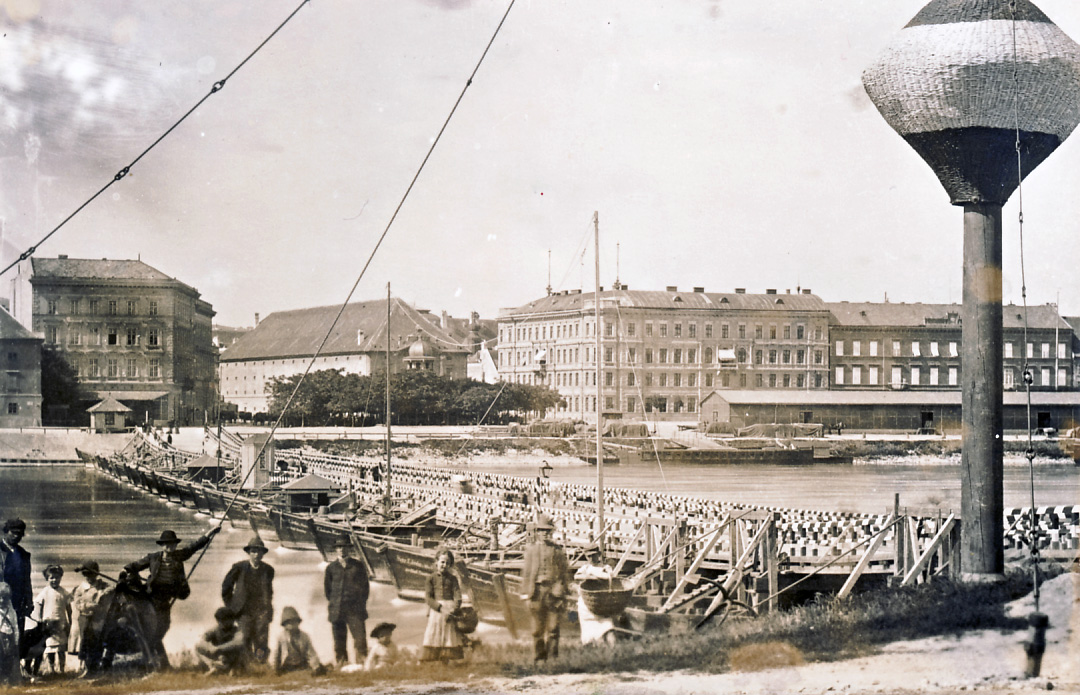
Caroline Augusta Bridge

Caroline Charlotte Augusta of Bavaria Bridge (Slovak: Most Karolíny Šarloty Augusty Bavorskej), shortly Caroline Augusta Bridge (Slovak: Most Karolíny Augusty), was a pontoon bridge in Bratislava, Slovakia which was built on the occasion of the Caroline Augusta coronation in 1825 to connect the coronation mount with Aupark. It was located approximately in the middle between contemporary Starý most and Most SNP. It was the last temporary bridge over the Danube in Bratislava.

== Description ==
It consisted of 23 boats and was exempted from collecting tolls, thus contributing to the development of trade between Bratislava and nearby villages.

The middle of the bridge could be opened for the passage of ships. For the winter, the bridge was dismantled so that it would not be damaged by floating ice. The bridge existed until the Franz Joseph Bridge was opened in 1890.

== Other sources ==
- Bočková, Monika (2021). "Mapping the Impact of the Danube Regulations between 1772 and 1896 on Urban Development / Bratislava a plánovaná rieka: Mapovanie vplyvu regulácií Dunaja v rokoch 1772 a 1896 na rozvoj mesta". Architektúra & Urbanizmus. 1–2 (2021). Ústav stavebníctva a architektúry SAV: 110. doi:10.31577/archandurb.2021.55.1-2.9.
