= Aupark Tower =

High-rise building in Bratislava, Slovakia

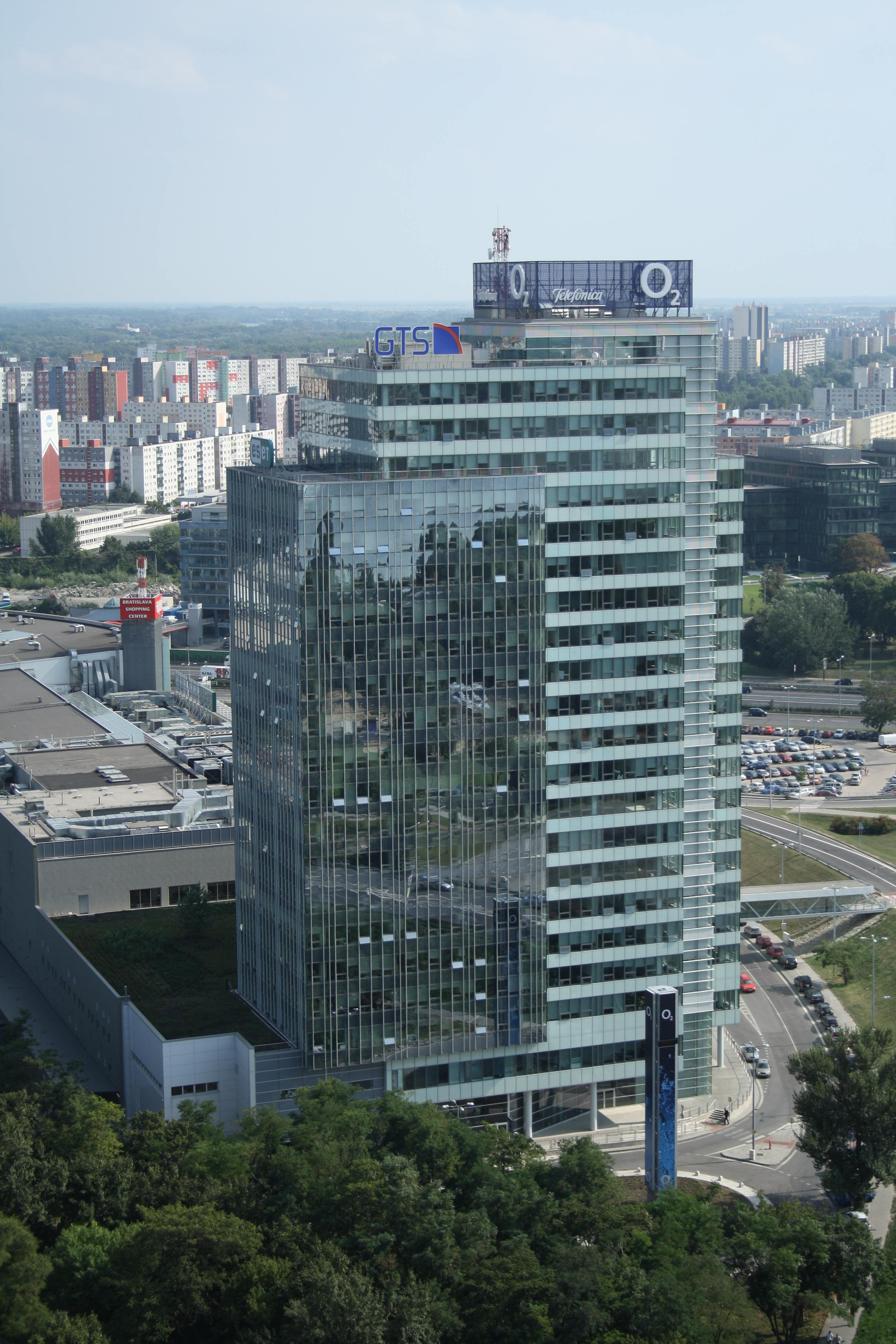
- Interactive map of the Aupark Tower area

General information
- Status: Completed
- Type: Office
- Location: Petržalka, Bratislava, Slovakia, Einsteinova 3541/24, 851 01 Petržalka, Bratislava
- Coordinates: 48.134125°N 17.105981°E
- Completed: 2007

Height
- Roof: 96 m (315 ft)

Technical details
- Structural system: Concrete
- Floor count: 22
- Floor area: 33,000 m^{2} (355,000 sq ft)

Design and construction
- Architect: AKJančina s. r. o.

Website
- Aupark Tower

Aupark Tower is a high-rise office building in Bratislava, Slovakia standing at 96 metres (314 ft) tall with 22 floors. It is located in the district of Petržalka which is a part of the Aupark shopping center. It was built by the HB Reavis Group company in 2007. In 2012, Heitman European Property Partners IV purchased the building for €85.6m. Currently, the office space of the building is occupied by a number of tenants, including Telefónica O2 Slovakia, Eset, Procter & Gamble and AT&T, among others.

== History ==
=== Architecture ===
The construction began in 2006, the framework was completed in the beginning of 2007 and it was completely finished by the end of 2007.

The building was approved by then mayor of Petržalka Vladimír Bajan, but the mayor of Bratislava Andrej Ďurkovský is also commonly blamed, as well as the Bratislava main architect Štefan Šlachta.

It has a staged shape and stands at a height of 96 meters, 22 floors and there were proposals to reduce it to 15 floors in order to allegedly save the panorama of Bratislava. The HB Reavis Group company was offered some lucrative ground on the Petržalka Danube-riverbank between the Old Bridge and the Apollo Bridge for a favorable cost. This solution was not realized, however, as it was decided that it would have been unprofitable for the city.

== Controversies ==
Aupark Tower altered a large number of Bratislava silhouettes due to its height and location. Many pictures in the historical Old Town can no longer be taken without inclusion of this structure. Opposers of the building also argued that the immediate vicinity of the New bridge and that the building optically devalues the Aupark (Sad Janka Kráľa) locality.

== Gallery ==
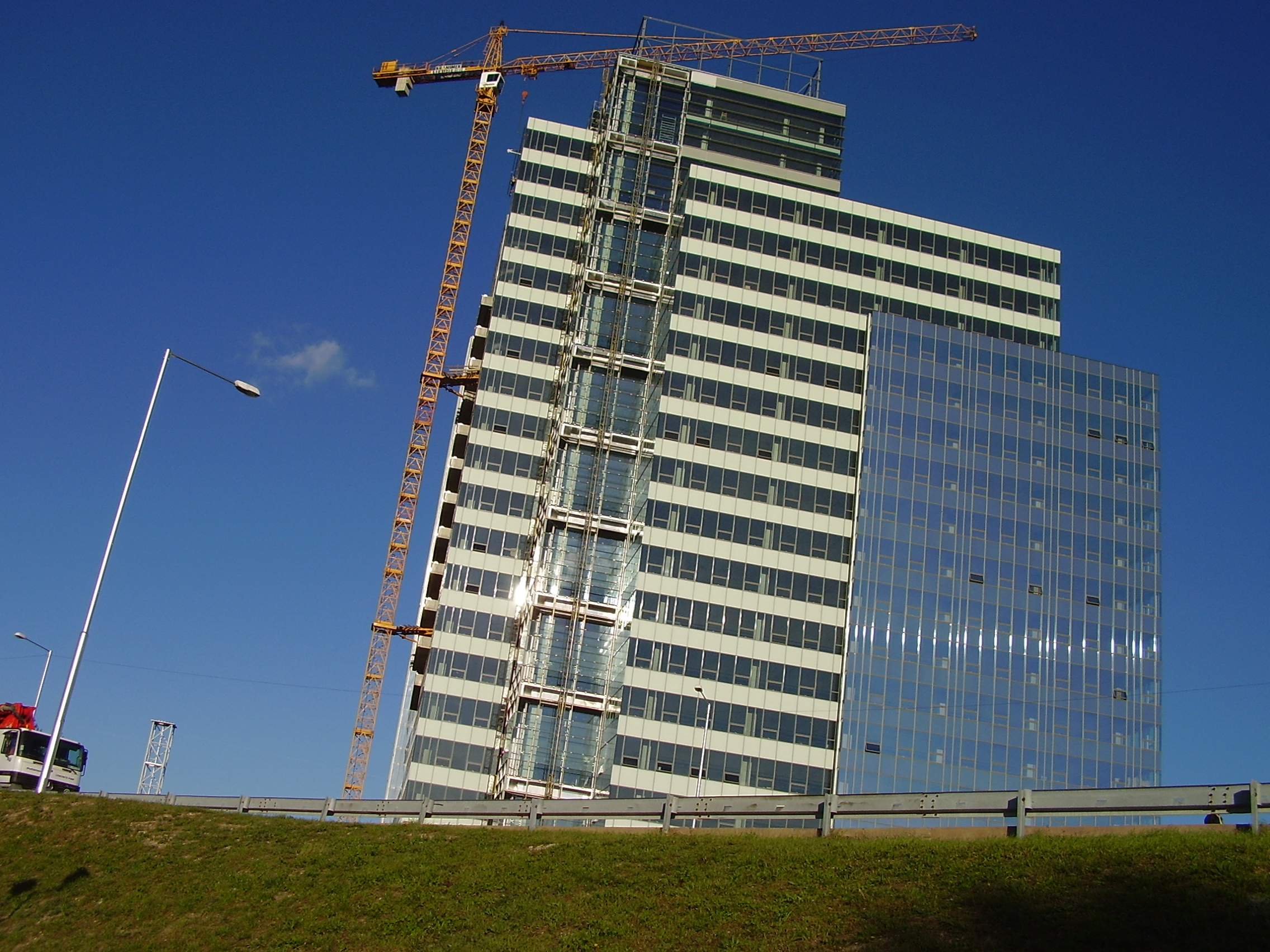
Aupark Tower just before finishing in October 2007

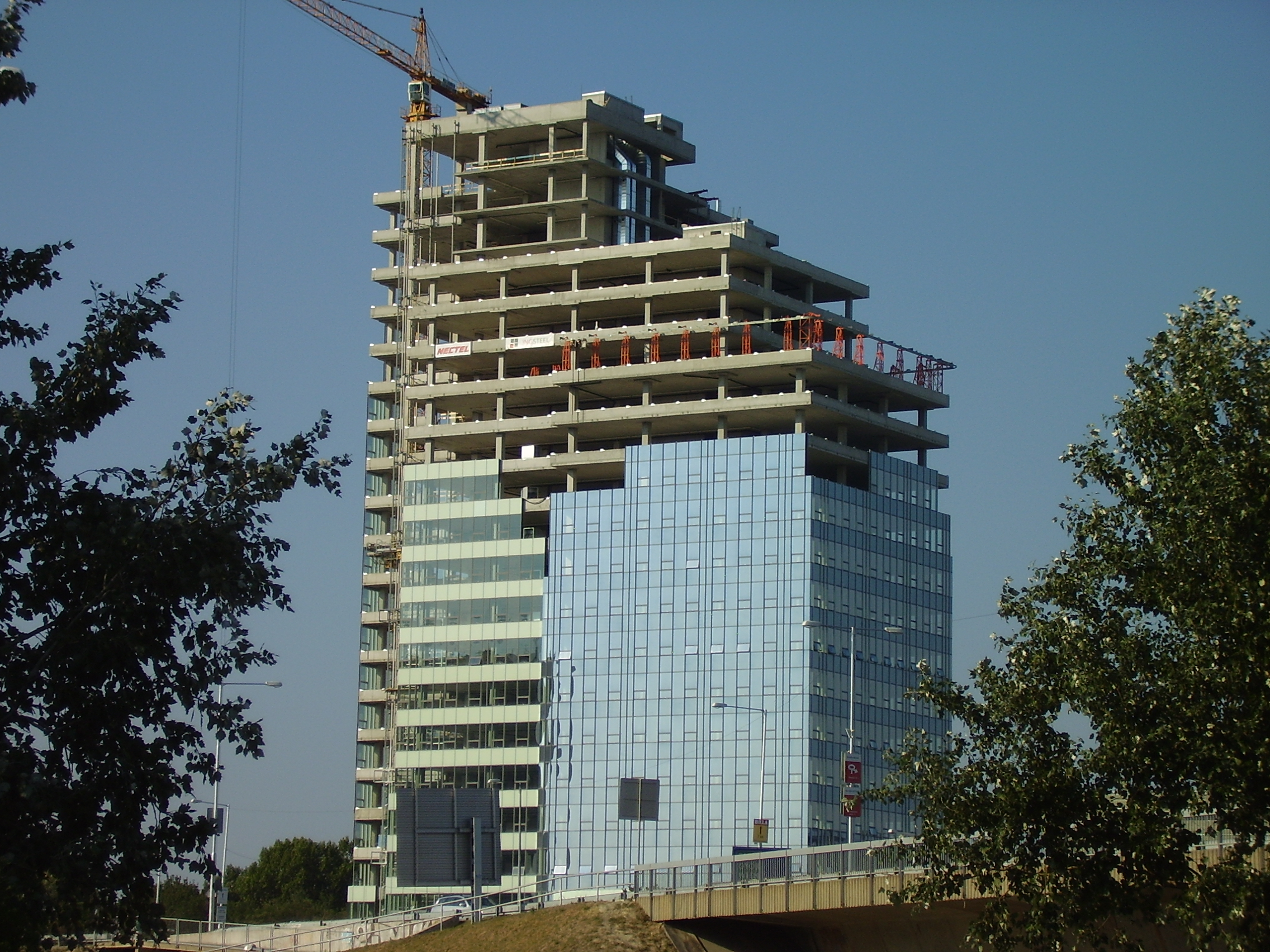
Aupark Tower, July, 21st 2007

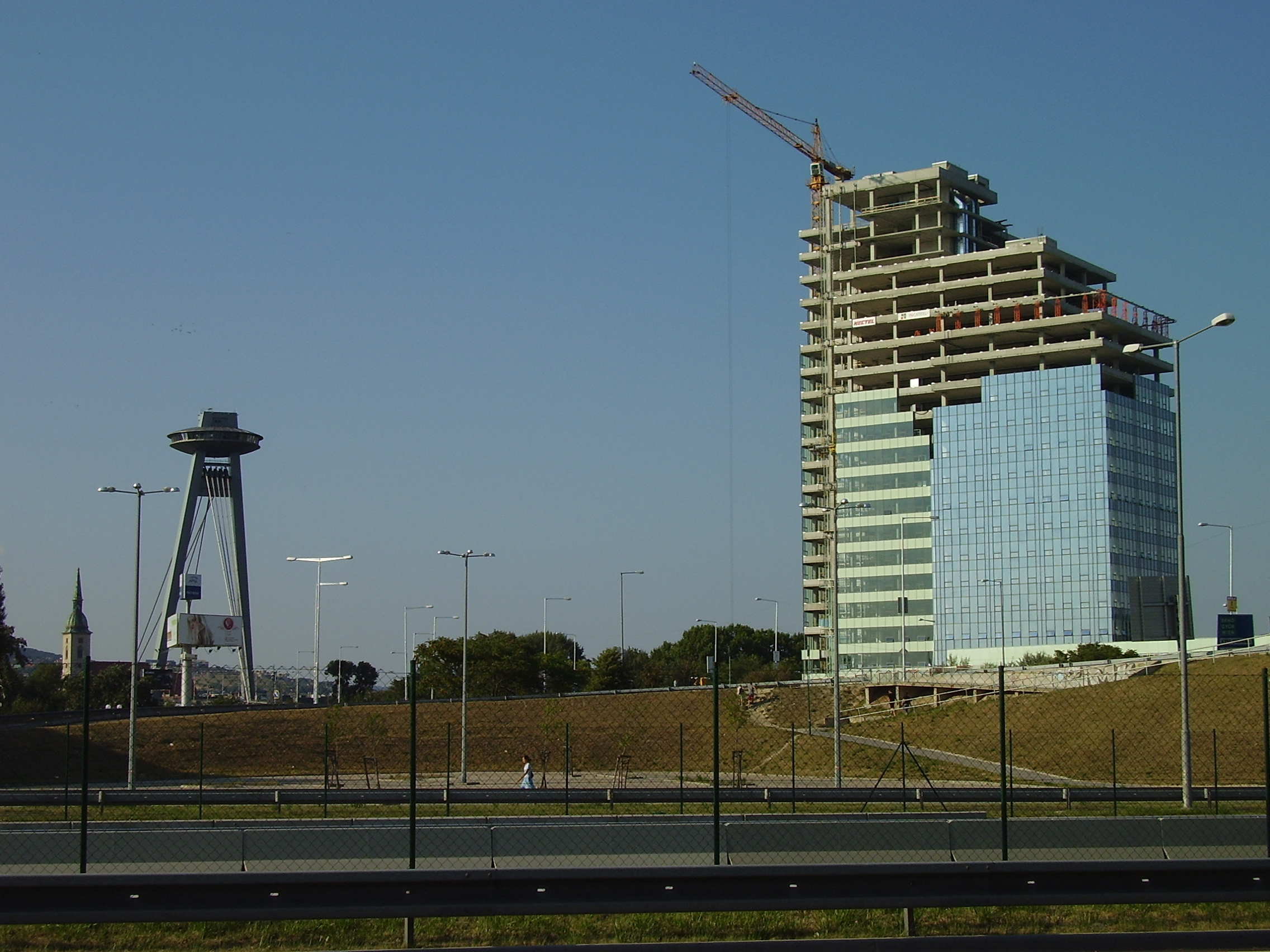
The New bridge pylon and Aupark tower

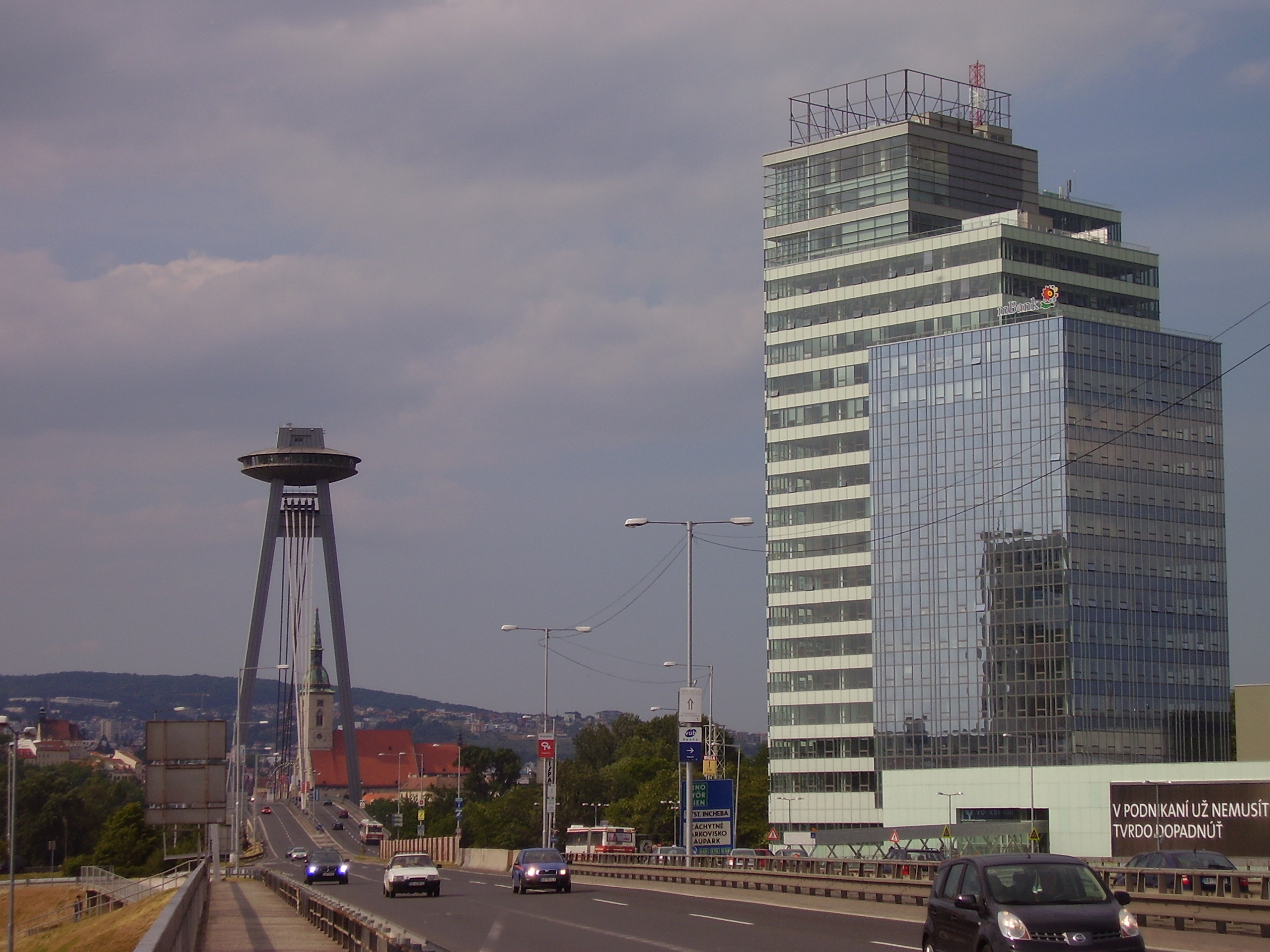
The Aupark Tower next to Most SNP

== See also ==
- List of tallest buildings in Slovakia
- List of tallest buildings in Bratislava
- Aupark
- Sad Janka Kráľa
