= Maria Theresa monument (Bratislava) =

Former monument in Bratislava, Slovakia

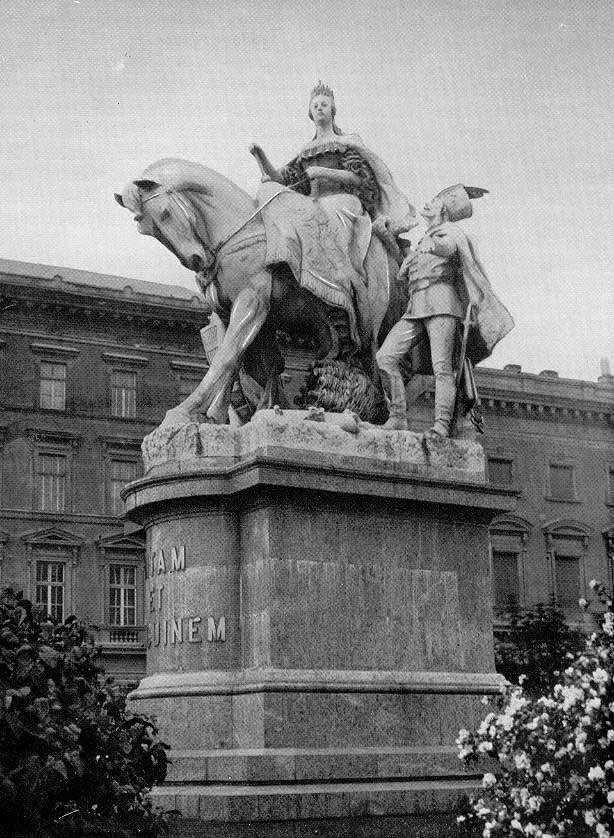
- General view of the monument
- Interactive map of Maria Theresa monument
- Location: Bratislava
- Designer: János Fadrusz
- Opening date: May 16, 1897
- Dismantled date: 1921

The Maria Theresa Monument was a monumental marble equestrian sculpture of the Hungarian Queen Maria Theresa made by the prominent Hungarian Presbyterian artist János Fadrusz, which stood on today's Ľudovít Štúr Square in Bratislava (Hungarian: Pozsony, German: Pressburg) from 1897 to 1921.

On Coronation Hill Square (today's Ľudovít Štúr Square), in the presence of the Austrian Emperor and King of Hungary, Franz Joseph I, a sculptural group dedicated to his great-great-grandmother, the monarch Maria Theresa, was unveiled. Only 23 years later, the statue would be pulled down due to growing anti-Hungarian sentiment in Czechoslovakia.

== History ==
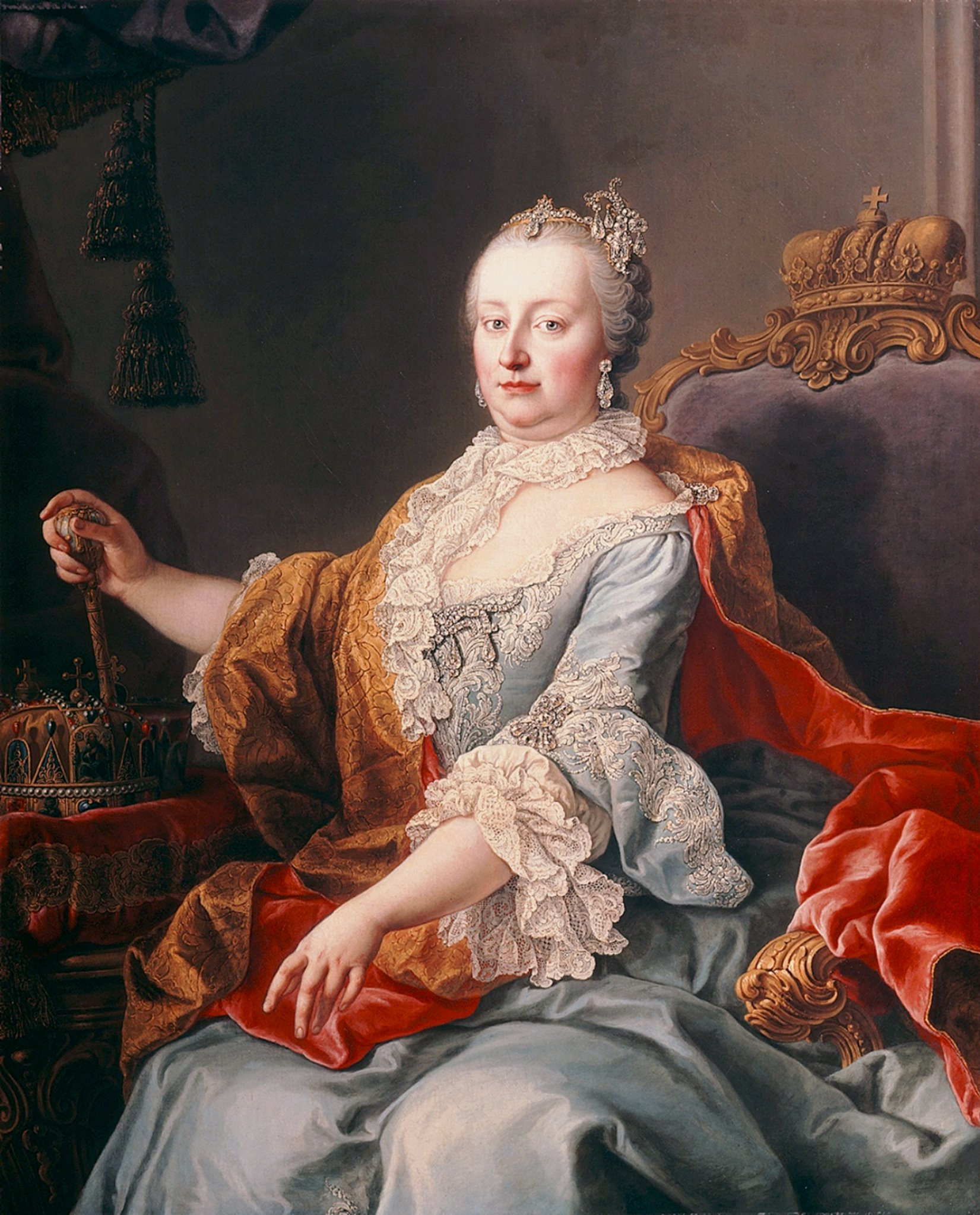
Portrait of Maria Theresa, the subject of the sculpture.

The monument was built during the celebration of the millennium of the Hungarians' arrival in Pannonia, which encompassed the entire Kingdom of Hungary. Bratislava (then Hungarian Pozsony and German-speaking Pressburg) was the coronation city of Hungarian monarchs and the seat of the Hungarian Diet. Maria Theresa was crowned in St. Martin's Cathedral in 1741.

The monument was ceremonially unveiled on May 16, 1897, in the presence of King Franz Joseph I and the Viennese court. It survived for less than 24 years, as it was demolished between October 26 and 29, 1921, by former Czechoslovak legionnaires, assisted by the police. This was due to the growing anti-Hungarian sentiment in Czechoslovakia, following two attempts by Charles IV to regain the throne in Budapest. Larger fragments of the destroyed composition were distributed among local sculptors for use in other works. Bratislava Hungarians preserved some smaller fragments, and the heads of two noblemen were saved and taken to Budapest. In 1938, a monument to Milan Rastislav Štefánik and the lion, symbolizing the Czechoslovak coat of arms, were erected in place of the Maria Theresa monument. The animal sculpture was removed in 1940, and the general in 1954. Thirty years later, it was replaced by a socialist realist monument by Ľudovít Štúr.

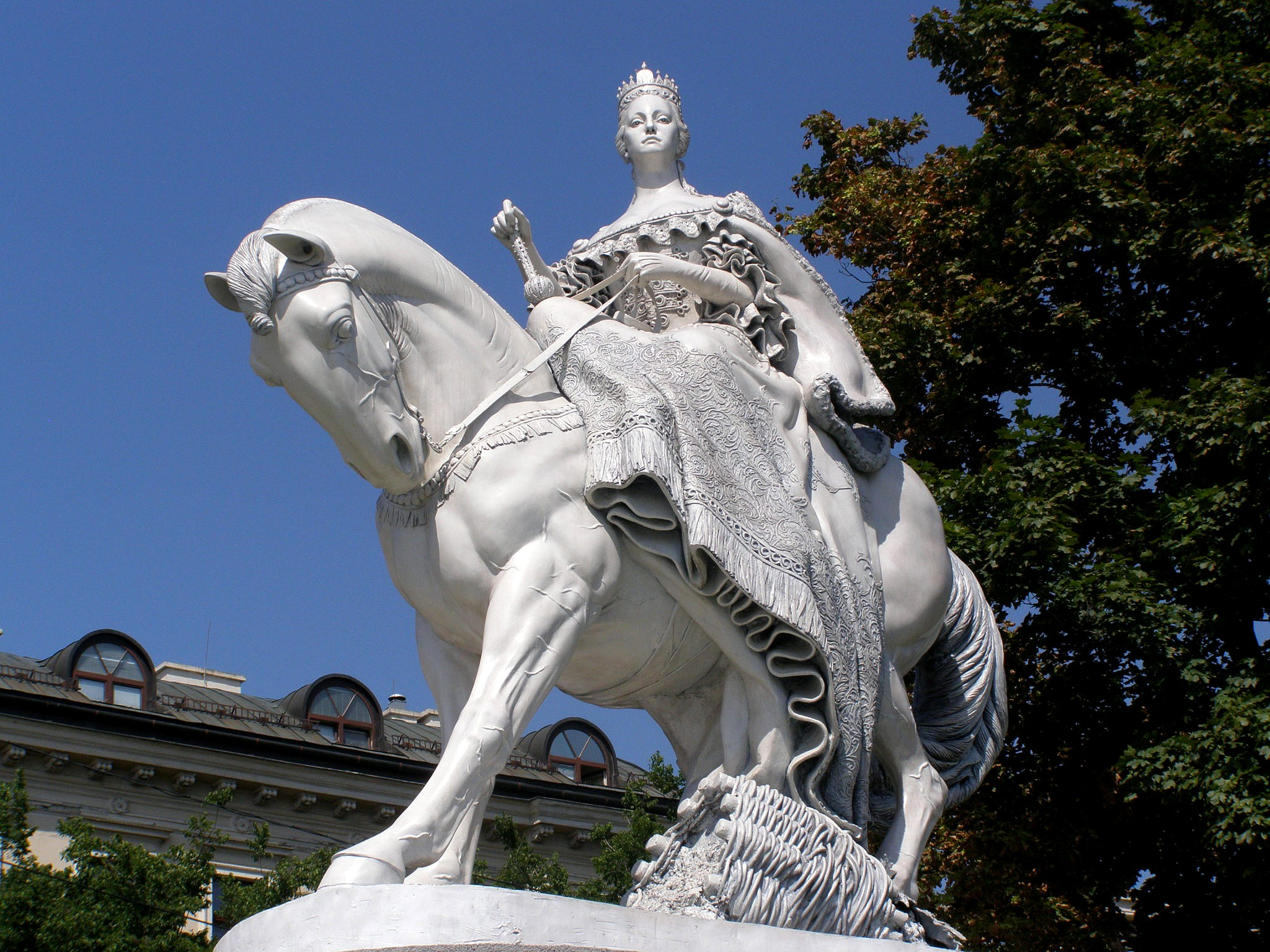
The re-created statue in 2018.

The initiative was taken by the Bratislavský okrášľovací spolok, which even had a one-third partial model of the original statue made and exhibited it in a park on the Danube embankment. At the same time, it launched a petition for the return of the monument to Maria Theresa and the simultaneous relocation of the Štúrovci monument standing here to another, more suitable place.

== Creation of the monument ==
The commission approached two of the most prominent sculptors of the time – both natives of Prešpor, Viktor Tilgner and János Fadrusz, to develop and submit their designs. Each of the artists had his own idea of the appearance of the monument. On June 19, 1893, the commission selected János Fadrusz as the contractor for the work and commissioned him to create a model. Two months later, on August 27, 1893, he completed the model in Budapest. After the commission's positive assessment of the model, in September 1894 he went to Tuscany to the city of Carrara, famous for the mining of high-quality white marble. Here, in the quarry where Michelangelo also sought material for his sculptures, he obtained the necessary block of rock.

== Description ==
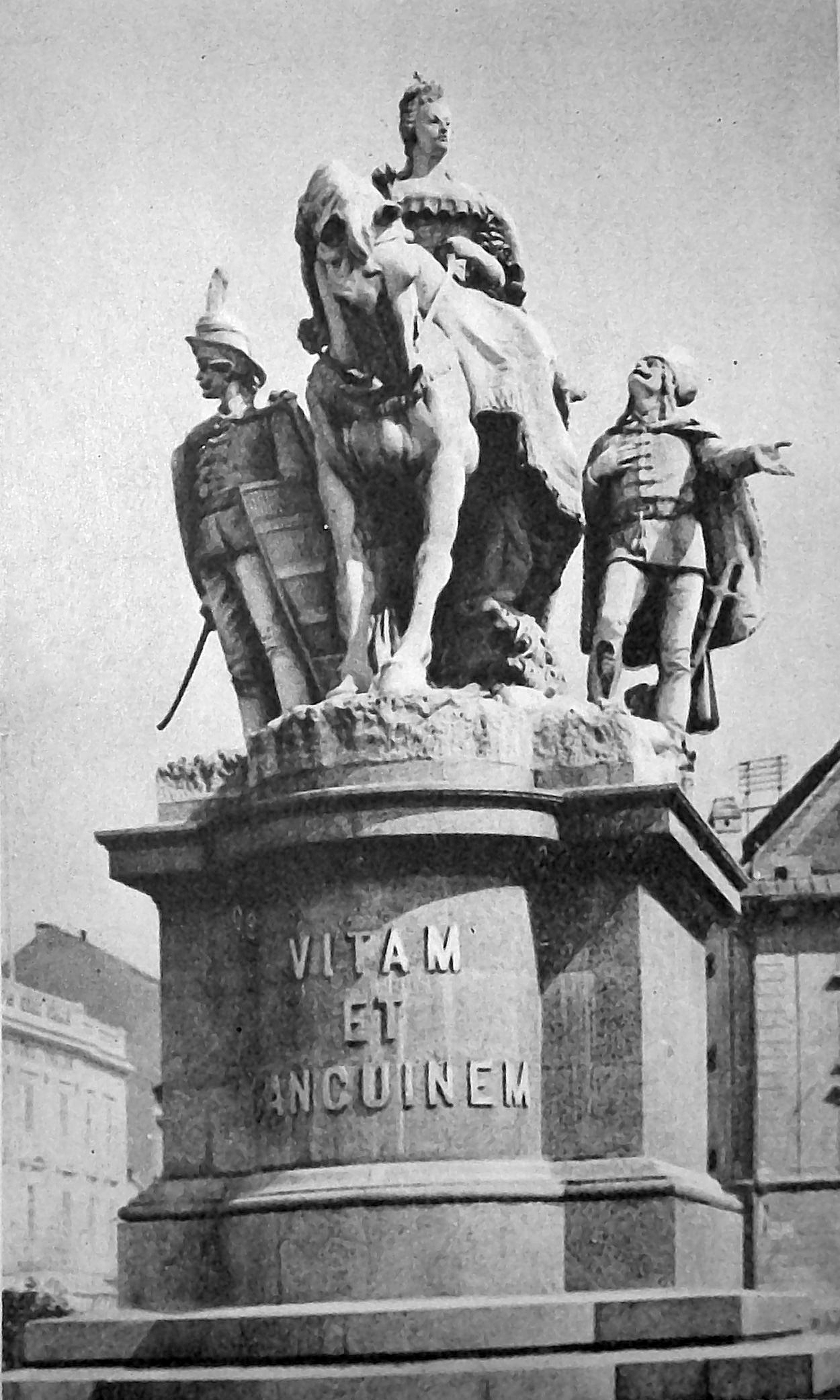
View from the front.

The monument depicted Maria Theresa on horseback, in Hungarian national costume and wearing the Crown of St. Stephen. She was accompanied by two hussars, symbolizing the devoted Hungarian nobility. The Latin motto "vitam et sanguinem" (life and blood) was inscribed on the pedestal, a shortened version of the cry raised by her subjects when the queen asked for their support in the War of the Austrian Succession (vitam et sanguinem pro rege nostro). The monument was created by the Hungarian sculptor János Fadrusz, born in Pozsony (Bratislava). The location was chosen deliberately, in the past, a small mound (Königsberg) stood there, where part of the coronation ceremonies took place.
