= Palace Cinemas (Central Europe) =

European theater chain

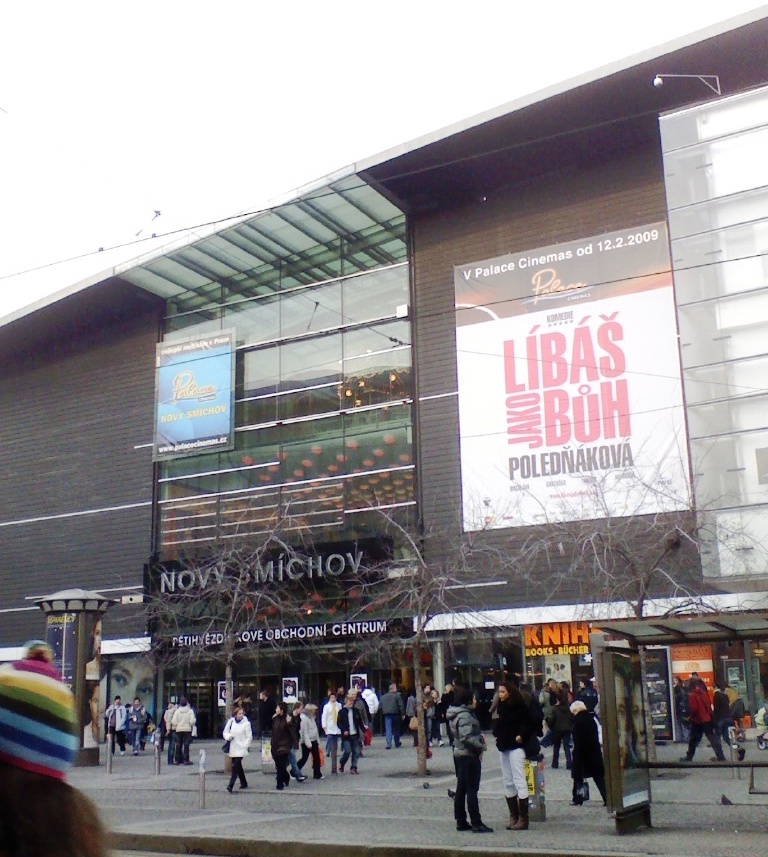
Palace Cinemas in Novy Smichov shopping centre, Prague.

Palace Cinemas was a cinema multiplex chain of 22 sites with 185 screens in the Czech Republic (8 theatres), Slovakia (3 theatres) and Hungary (11 theaters). Originally Palace Cinemas was a joint venture of United Cinemas International (UCI), but later was fully owned by Argus Capital Partners. On 20 January 2011 Palace Cinemas was bought by Cinema City.

Founded in 1999 together with two experienced media entrepreneurs, Palace has grown into the regional leader by developing its own high quality sites as well as through market consolidation, having made major acquisitions of its competitors in 2002, 2005 and 2006.

In Slovakia Palace Cinemas operated multiplex cinemas in the capital city Bratislava in Aupark Shopping Center (12 screens), Polus City Center (8 screens) and Eurovea Galleria (9 screens). All these multiplexes were sold by argus (the group who owned palace cinemas) to Cinema City in the span of 2011.

Cinema City Aupark has 12 screens and a total capacity of 2,338 seats. By the number of seats it was the 5th largest site of the Palace Cinemas chain. Screens #4 (275 seats), #9 (205 seats) and #10 (140 seats) are digital. Screens #4 and #9 are used for 3D-projections (MasterImage).
