= Ľudovít Štúr Square =

Square in Bratislava, Slovakia

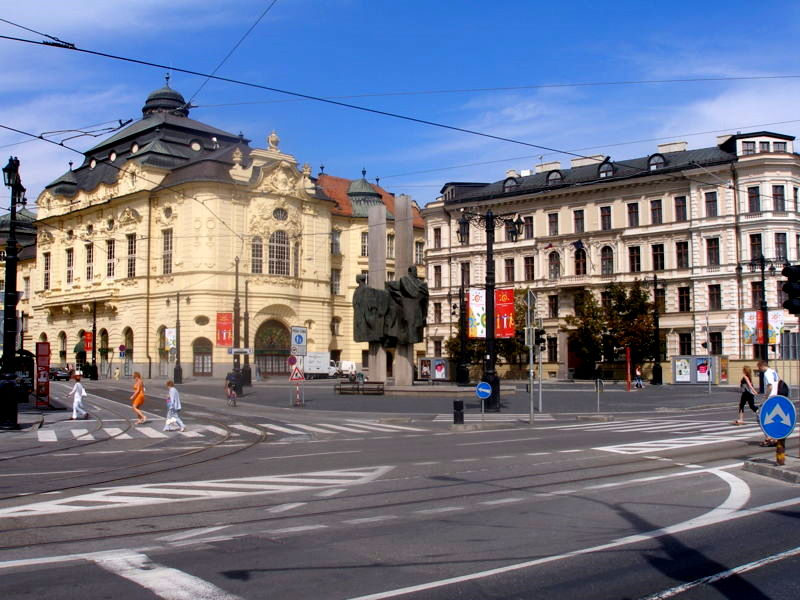
- Interactive map of Ľudovít Štúr Square
- Type: Square
- Location: Old Town, Bratislava
- Coordinates: 48.140243°N 17.109915°E

Ľudovít Štúr Square is a square in the Old Town district of Bratislava.

It is named after Ľudovít Štúr (1815 – 1856), a Slovak national awakener. Until 1918 it had the German and Hungarian names Krönungs-hügel-Platz and Koronázási Domb-tér, meaning Coronation Hill Square. It is located near the Danube embankment, between Mostova Street, Rázus Embankment and Vajanského Embankment.

The square was also home to the Maria Theresa monument which was a monumental marble equestrian sculpture of the Hungarian Queen Maria Theresa made by the prominent Presbyterian artist Ján Fadrusz, which stood on today's Ľudovít Štúr Square 1897 to 1921.

Among the important buildings are the headquarters of the Slovak Philharmonic Reduta, Esterházy Palace and Dežőfi Palace.

== Transport connection ==
- Square. Ľ. Štúr (as at 13 February 2023)
  - Tram: 1; 4
  - Bus: 29; 50; 70; N33

== Gallery ==
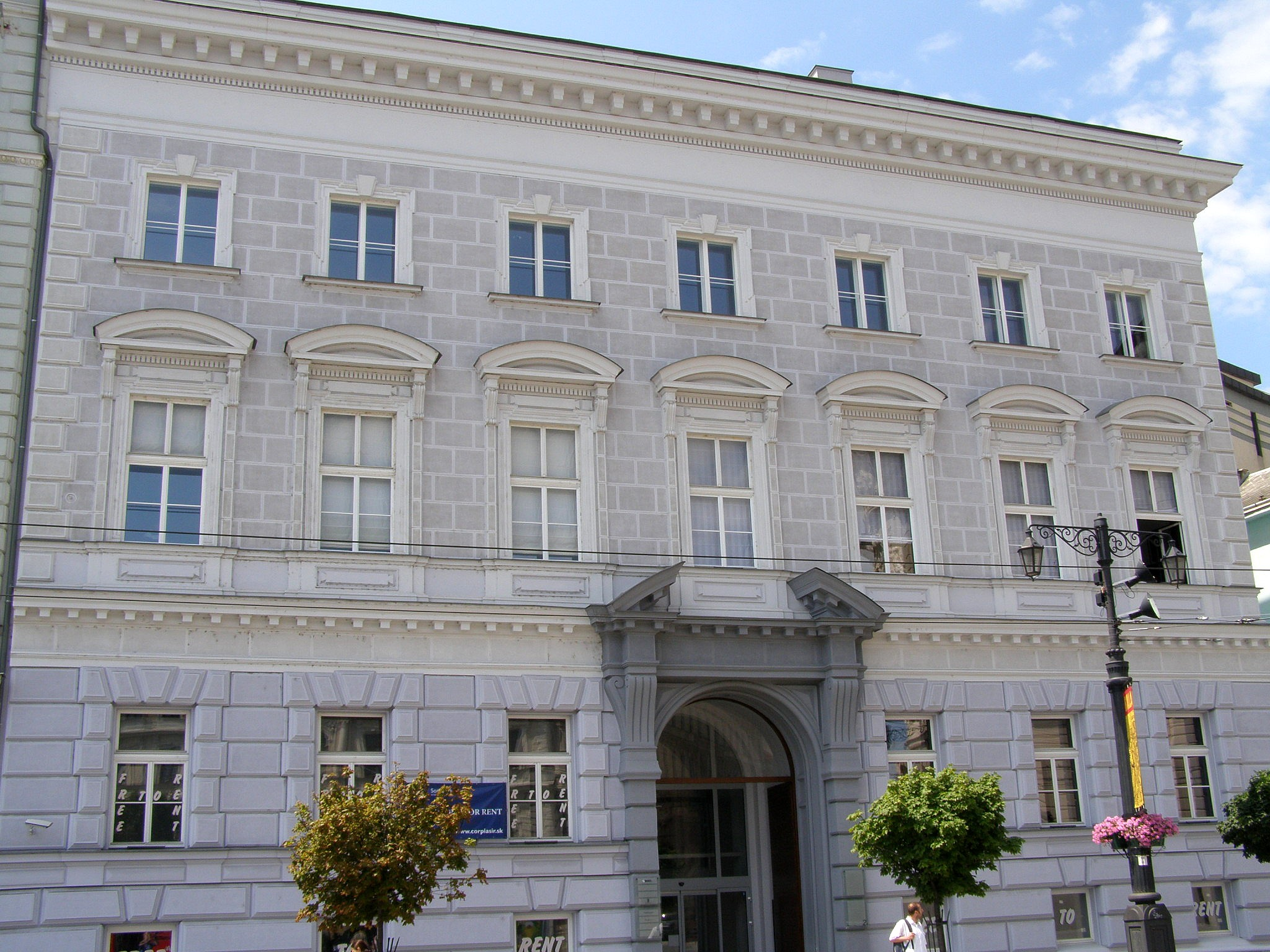
Dezőfi Palace

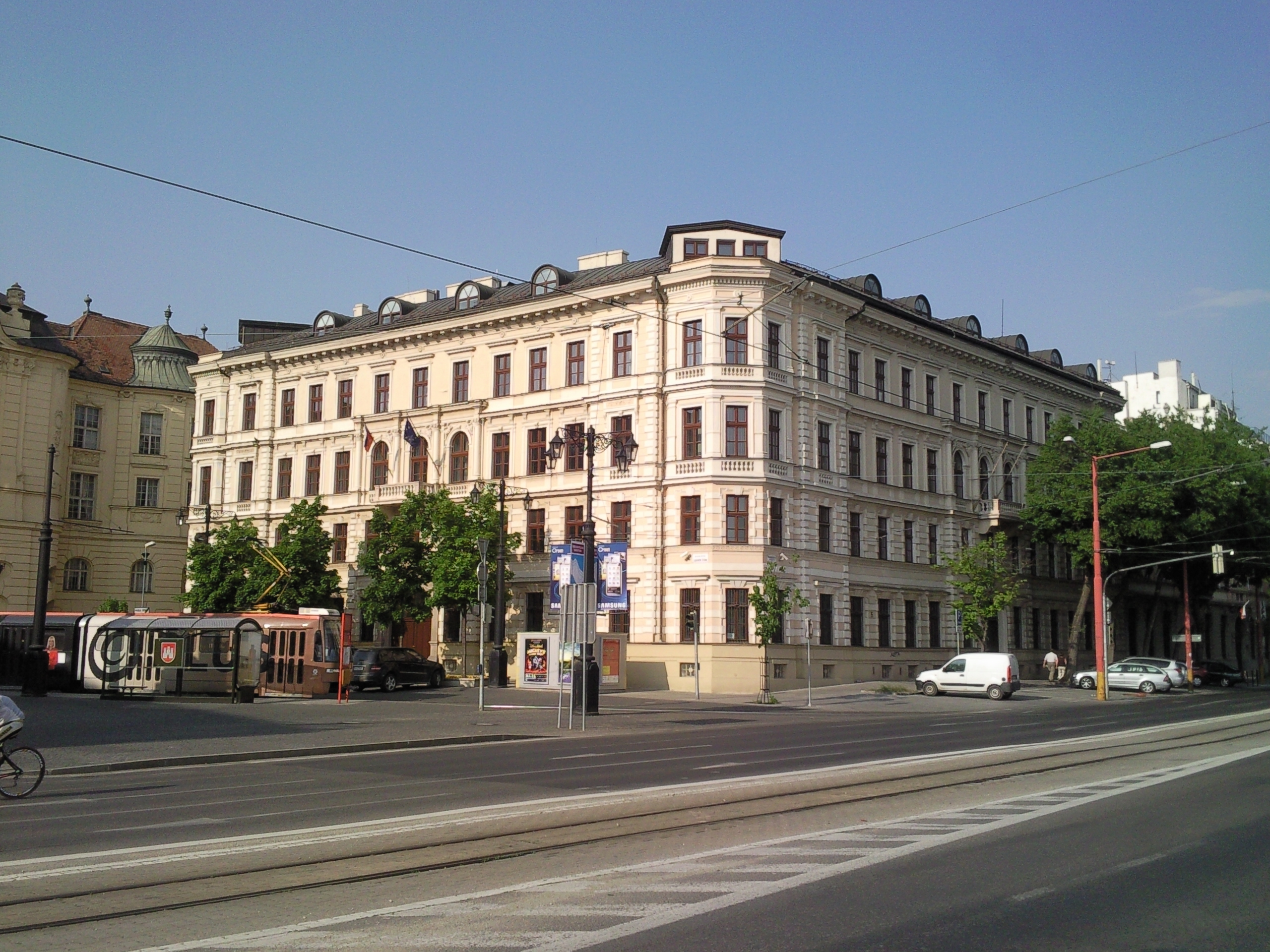
Lanfranconi Palace
