= Arena Theatre =

Theatre in Bratislava, Slovakia

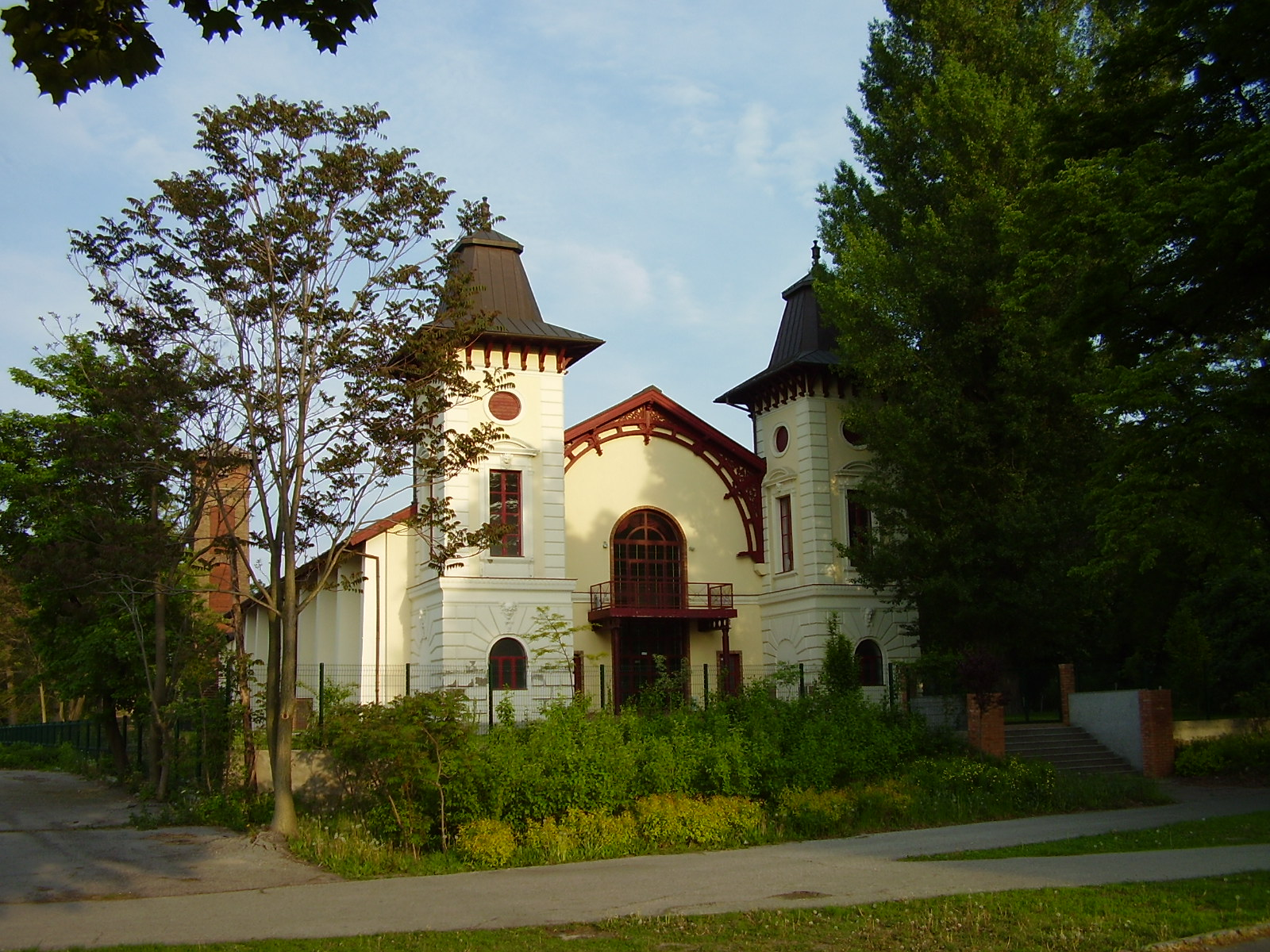
- Interactive map of Arena Theatre
- Location: Bratislava, Slovakia
- Coordinates: 48°08′09″N 17°06′52″E

Website
- Official website

Arena Theatre (Slovak: Divadlo Aréna) is one of the oldest theatres in Bratislava. It was established on the right bank of the Danube in 1828 as an amphitheatre. The current building was built in 1899.

From its establishment until the start of the Second World War, many Hungarian, Austrian and German theatre companies performed there. In the bombing of Starý most at the end of the war, the theatre building sustained damage and was subsequently closed to the public for more than 50 years.After the war, the theatre served as a storehouse for state-owned Czechoslovak Television.

In the years after the Velvet Revolution, the theatre was revived by a group of people around mime artist Milan Sládek, with an annual pantomime festival under the name of Festival Kaukliar starting there in 1996.

In 2003, renowned Slovak actor Juraj Kukura became managing director and focus of the theatre shifted to drama. Kukura remained in charge until stepping down on 30 June 2025. The performance of The Goat or Who is Sylvia? (Note: co-production with Prague-based The Drama Club) was nominated for Dosky Awards for the 2003–04 theatre season. Juraj Kukura and Emília Vášáryová won the categories of best actor and best actress for their roles in the production. A year later, monodrama Tiso was voted the best performance. The play won a total of four awards including best actor for Marián Labuda's portrayal of Jozef Tiso.

Reconstruction of the building began in 2022: at a cost of around €7 million, the water tower and the wings were restored, a tower was added to the roof and a café was added to the site.
