= Lanfranconi Palace =

Palace in Bratislava, Slovakia

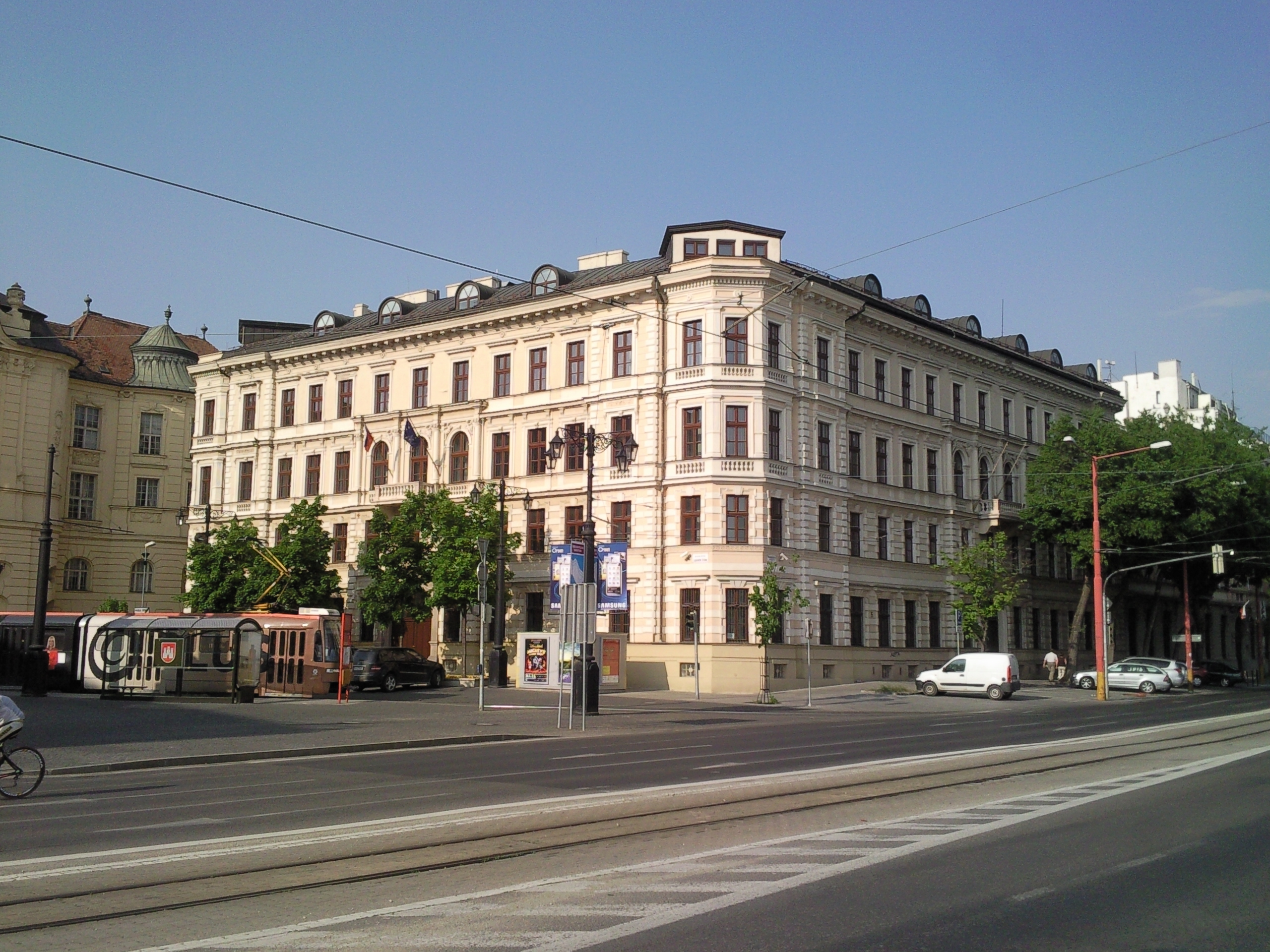
- Interactive map of the Lanfranconi Palace area

General information
- Type: Palace
- Location: Old Town, Bratislava, Slovakia
- Coordinates: 48.140044°N 17.109614°E

Lanfranconi Palace or Lafranconi Palace is a neo-Renaissance representative bourgeois apartment house in Bratislava's Old Town, on the corner of Ludovita Štúr Square (number 1) and Vajanského nábreží. The building was built in 1876-1877 by Ignác Feigler on the site of the former salt office. The iron roof structure comes from the buildings of the Vienna World Exhibition.

It was commissioned by Antonio Lanfranconi (or Antonio Lafranconi), but as it was built after his death, it was only used by his son Enea Grazioso Lanfranconi.

Today, the palace houses the Ministry of Environment of the Slovak Republic.
