= Au Café =

Historical coffee shop in Slovakia

Coordinates: 48°8′12″N 17°6′34″E

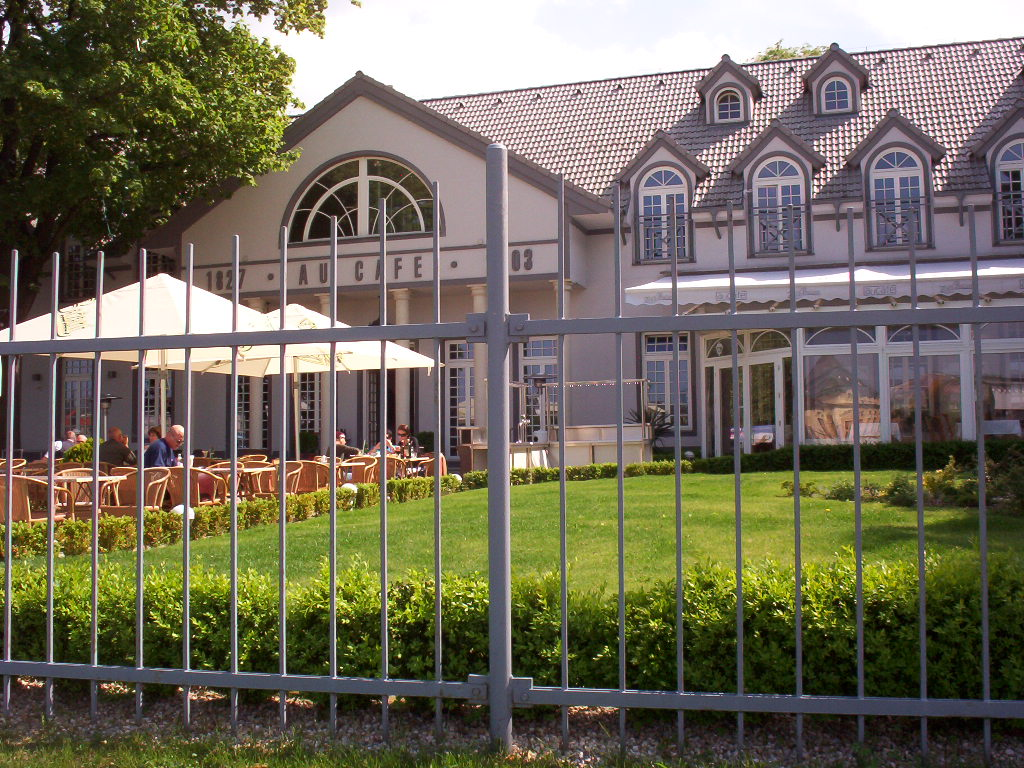
Au Café

The historical building of Au Café was built in Bratislava, Slovakia (then Pressburg, Kingdom of Hungary), from 1826 to 1827, opening as a coffee shop on 3 May 1827. For over 100 years it was a famous restaurant and coffee shop, until it went into decline in the 1960s. On 12 September 2003 a replica of the Au Café building opened on the same site, with a Berlitz language centre as well as a restaurant and café.

== See also ==
- History of Bratislava
