= Starý most =

Bridge in Slovakia

Coordinates: 48°08′18″N 17°07′02″E

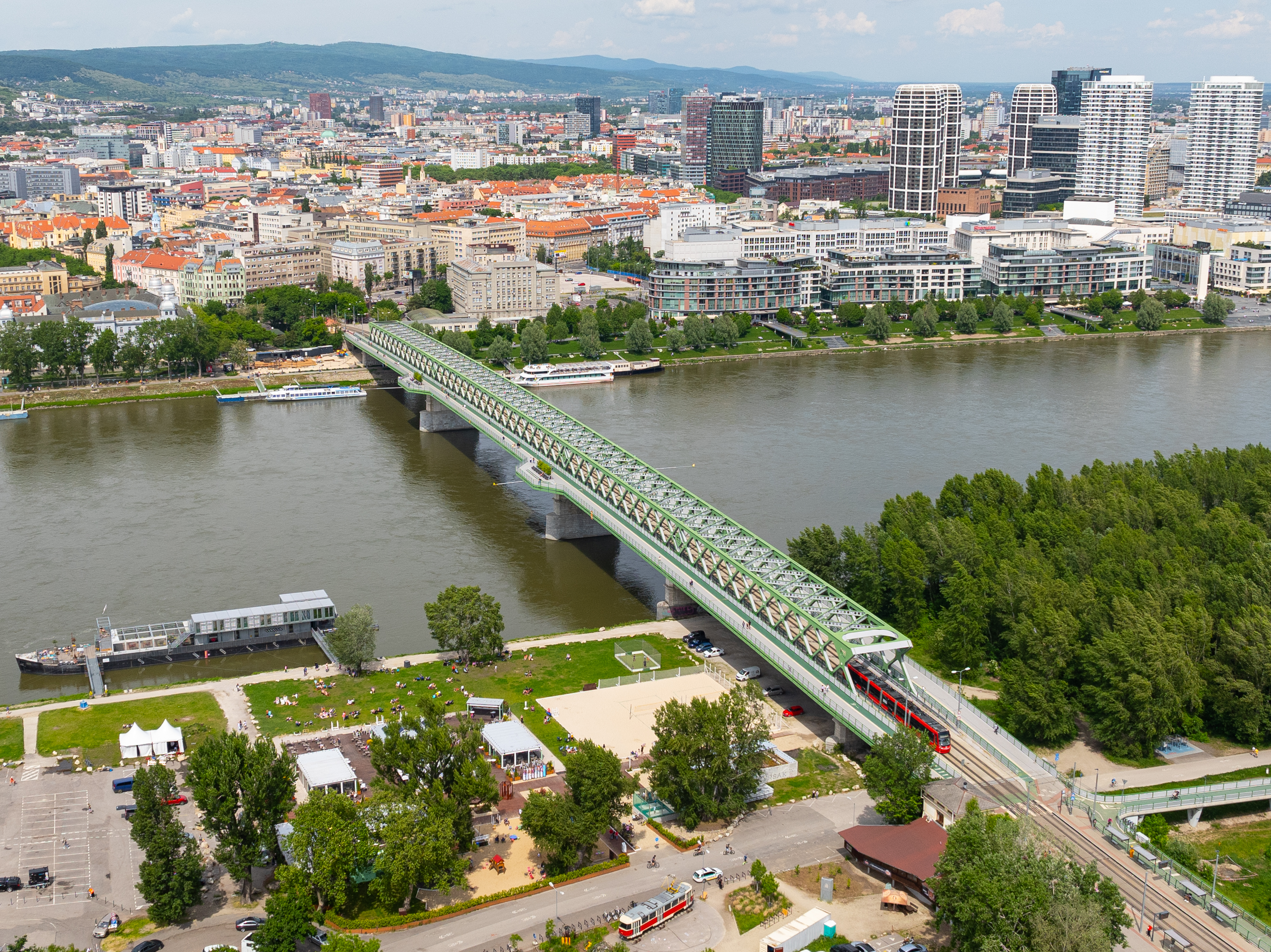
Starý most

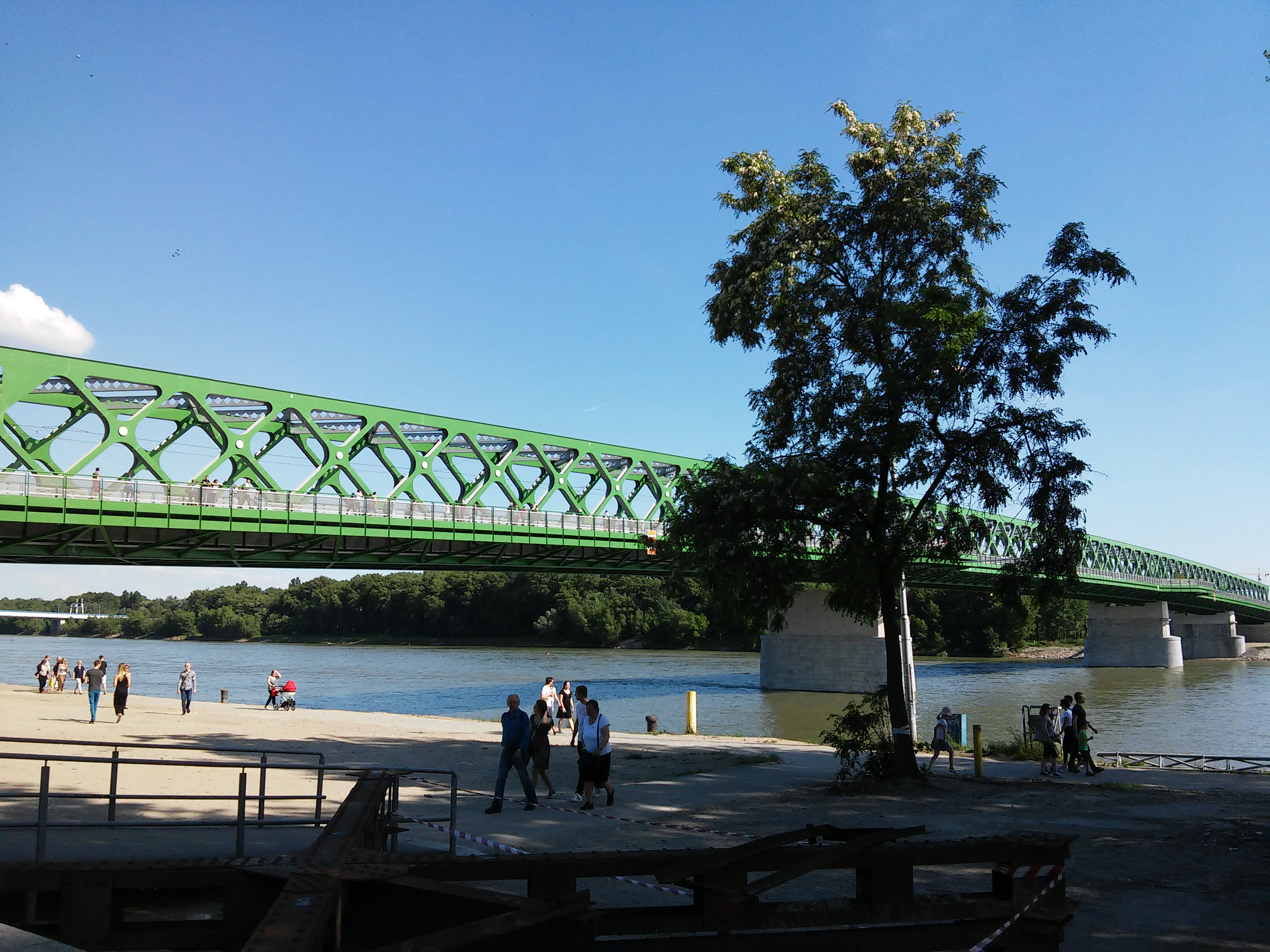
Starý most (after reconstruction)

Starý most (English: Old Bridge) is a bridge over the river Danube in Bratislava, Slovakia. The bridge was built as part of a railway project initiated by Hungarian retired general Gusztáv Dunst. Before its reconstruction, the 460-meter-long (1,510 ft) bridge included a wooden pathway for pedestrians, a two-lane road, and a railway track, connecting the historic old city of Bratislava with the newer region Petržalka. The bridge was closed for cars in 2009 and for buses on 14 May 2010. On 2 December 2013 it was also closed for pedestrian and bicycle traffic as deconstruction of the old bridge began. At the time of its closure it was the oldest standing bridge in Bratislava.

As of December 2015, the bridge was replaced by a new one for pedestrians, cyclists and trams, as part of new tram track to Petržalka.

At various times in the past, the bridge was called Most Červenej armády (i.e. Red Army Bridge), Štefánikov most, Ferenc József híd and Franz Josef Brücke.

== History ==
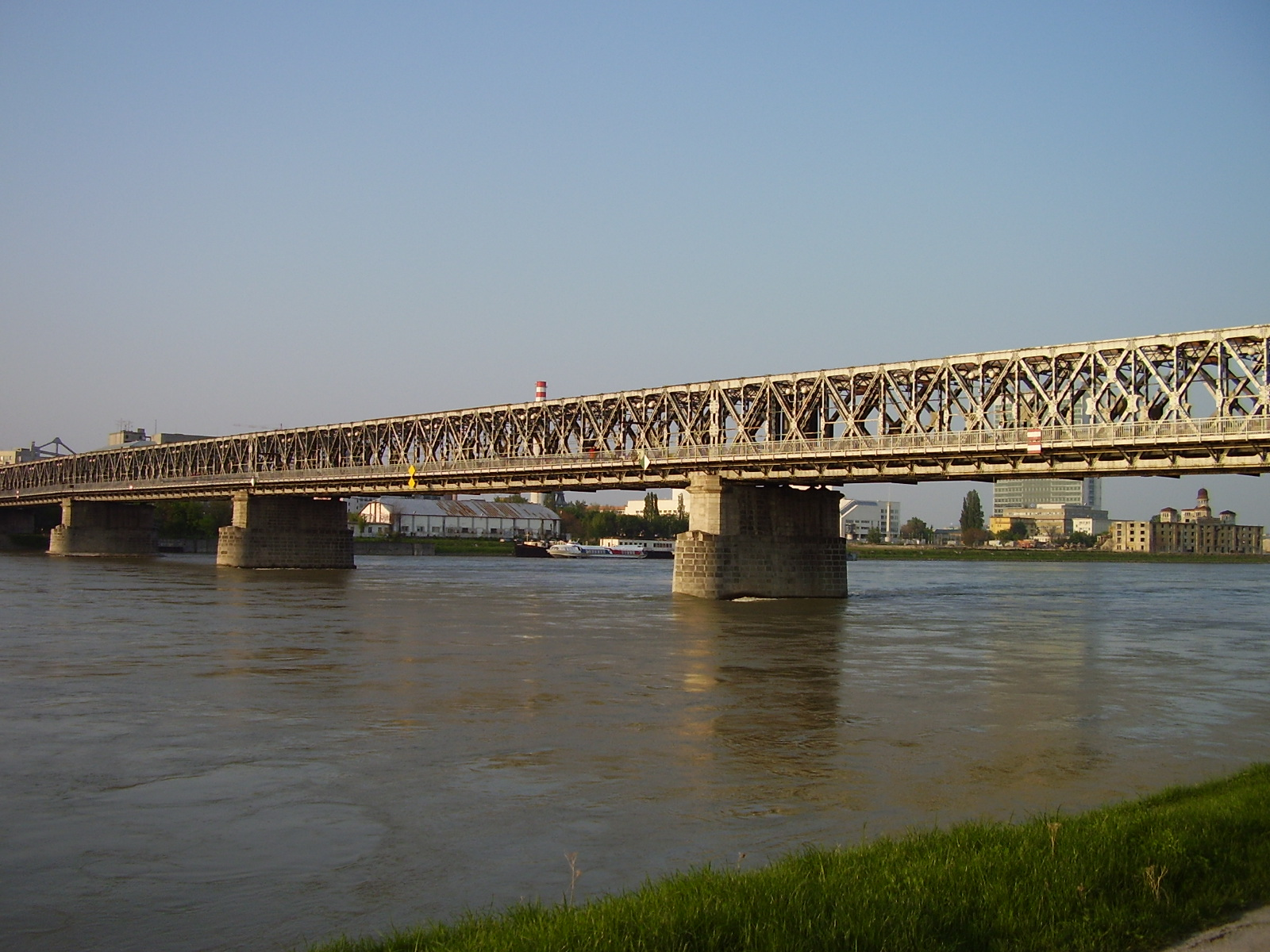
Starý most (before reconstruction)

Aside from short-lived wooden bridges before the 19th century, which were often damaged or destroyed by floods and frost, the first bridge in Pozsony (today's Bratislava) was a pontoon bridge, which was built in 1825, standing somewhere around Koronázási domb tér or Krönungshügel platz (today's Ľudovít Štúr Square). It lasted until 1891, when a new steel bridge called Ferenc József híd or Franz Josephs Brücke (Franz Joseph Bridge), was opened, which was part of the railroad track Pozsony-Szombathely. It was built by Gábor Baross' order. During the First Czechoslovak Republic (1918 - 1938) it was called Štefánikov most (Štefánik Bridge). During World War II the steel part of the bridge was destroyed, but the stone pillars survived. After the occupation of Bratislava from the collaborationist Slovak Republic by Soviet troops in 1945, the Red Army and German prisoners-of-war rebuilt the bridge. It was later used by the Soviet Army and the Hungarian People's Army to invade Czechoslovakia during the Prague Spring of 1968. Soviet soldiers killed five Comenius University students attempting to resist the invasion. In 1972, after Most SNP (lit. Slovak National Uprising Bridge) was opened, it was Old Bridge renamed to Red Army Bridge, in honour of Soviet troops that liberated the city.

== Car-free future ==
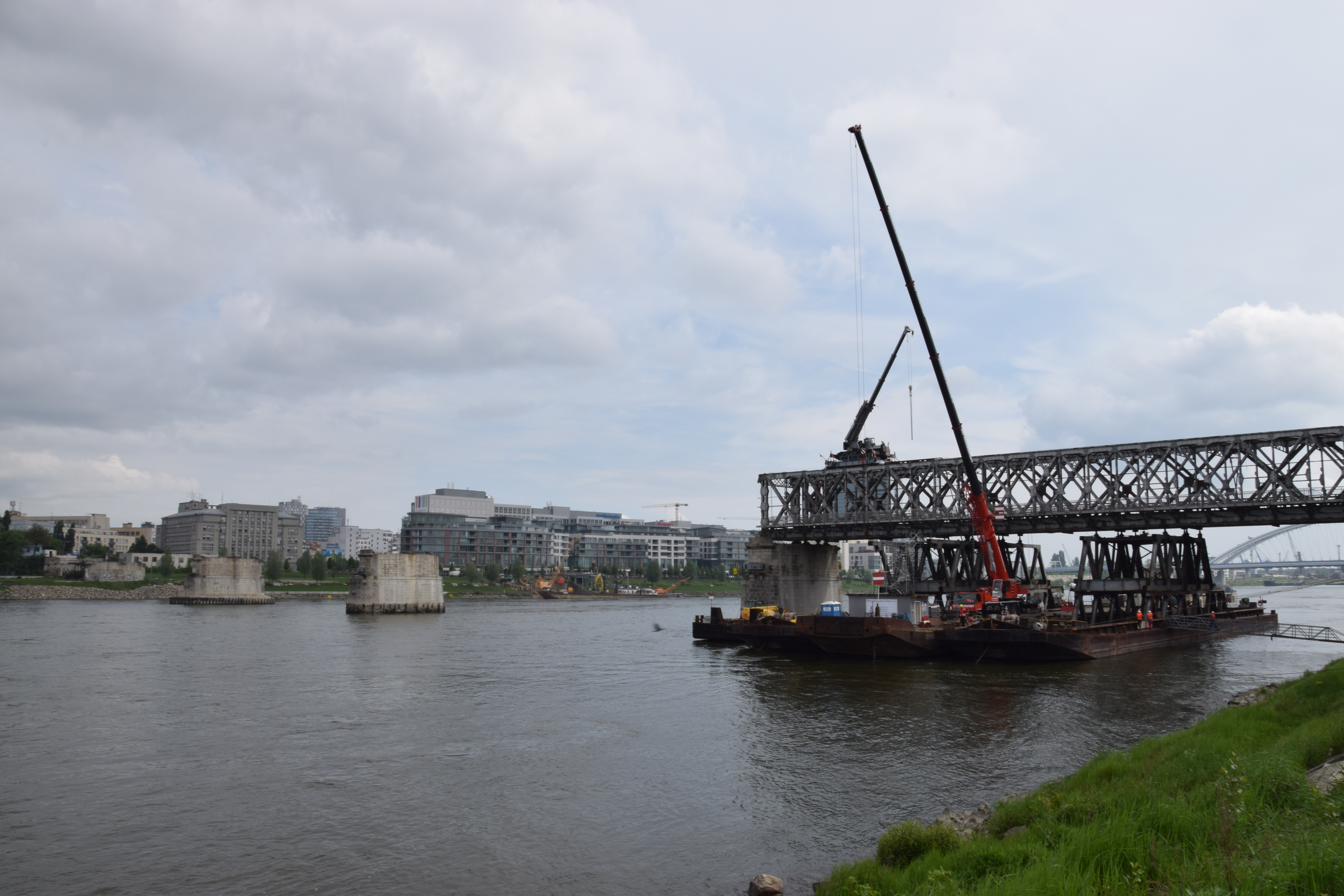
Dismantling of Starý most on 29 April 2014

On 1 January 2009 the city of Bratislava closed the bridge to motor vehicles except buses because of problems with statics and on 15 May 2010 also for buses, pedestrians and cyclists. The bridge was reopened to cyclists and pedestrians a few months later after the road for cars was removed and remained open until 08:00 on 2 December 2013 when it was closed for all traffic again due to its deconstruction which started in late November 2013. As of December 2015, the bridge was replaced by a new one for pedestrians, cyclists and trams, as part of new tram track to Petržalka.

== Gallery ==
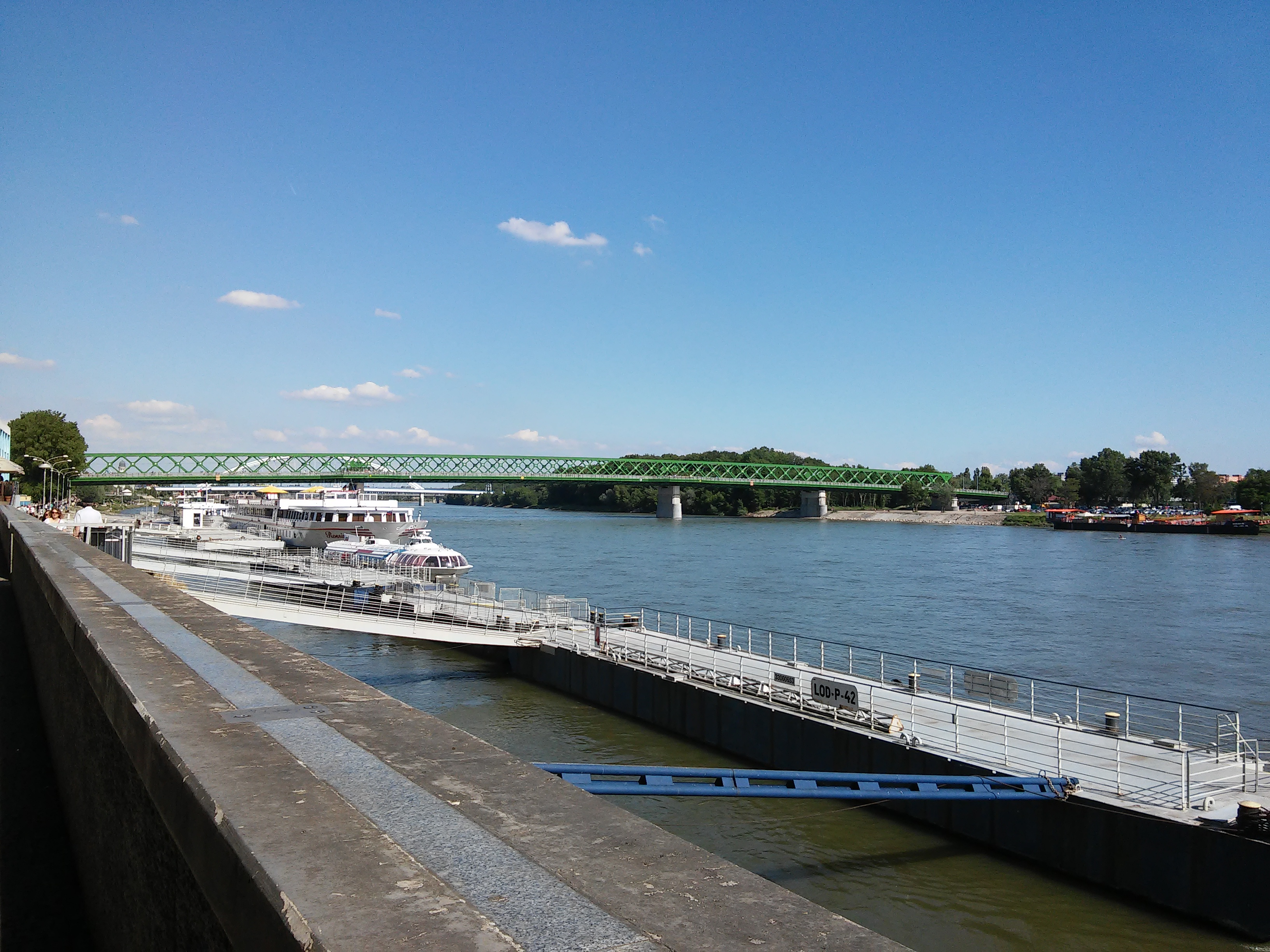

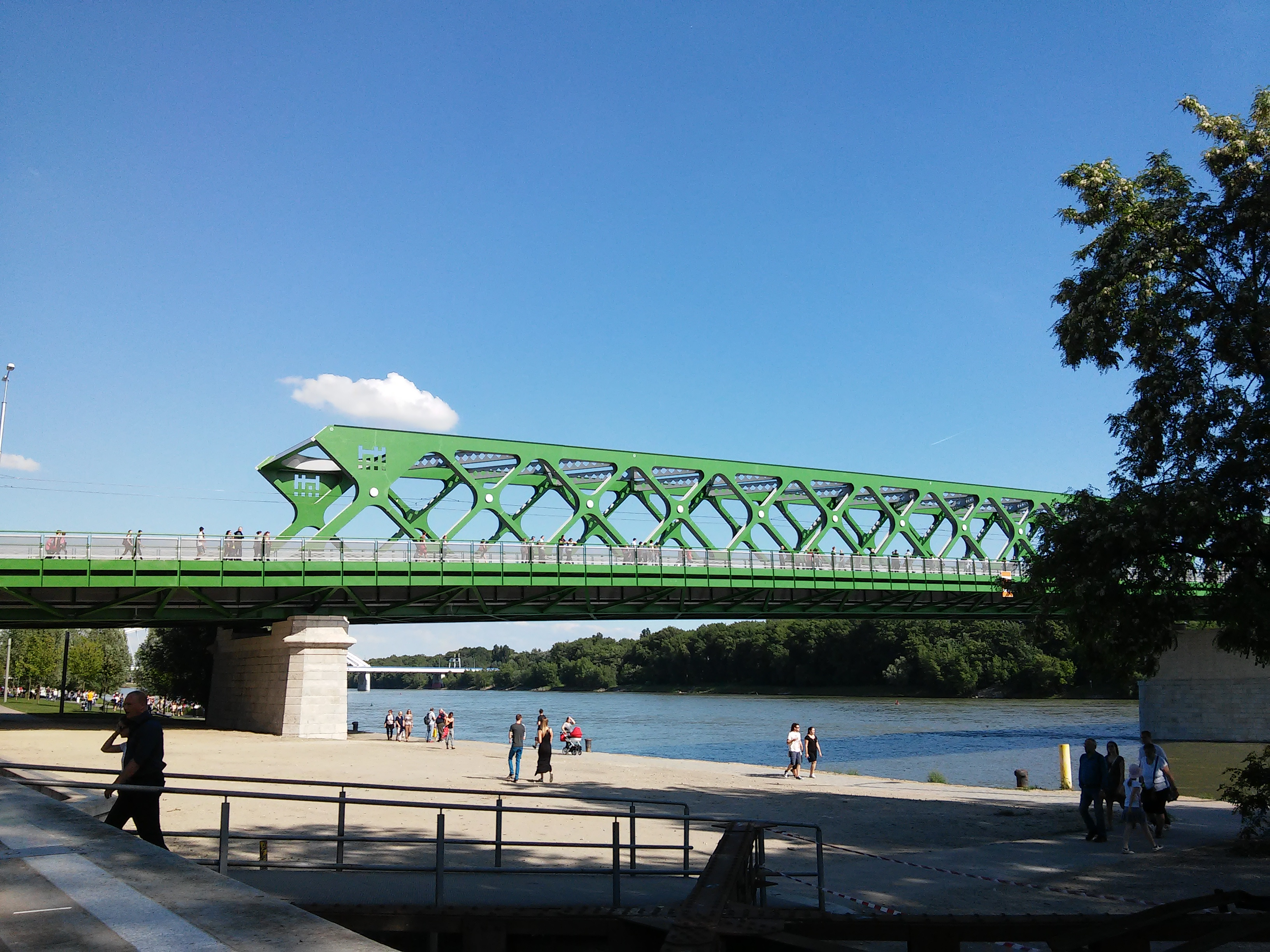

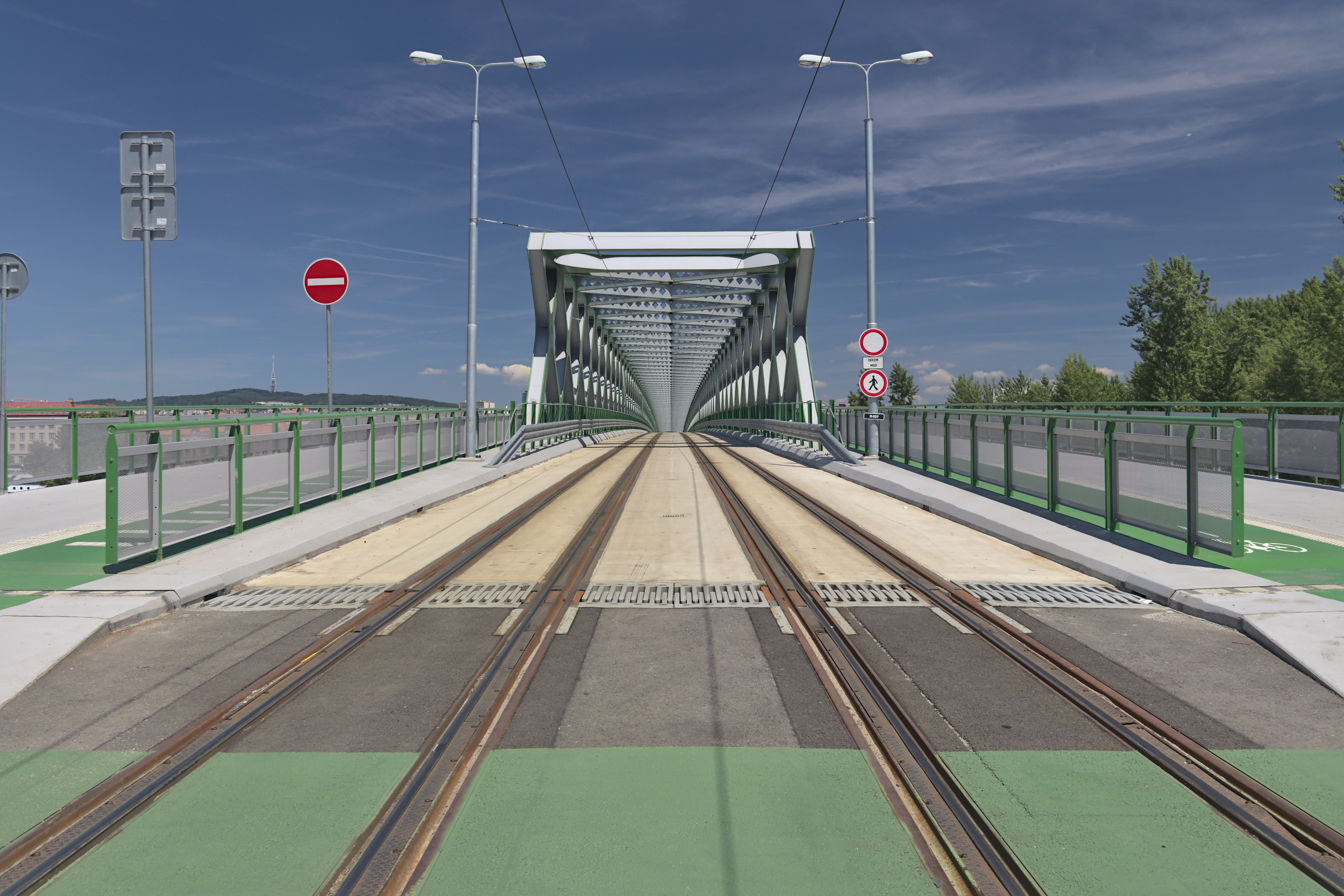
